= Sir Thomas Miller, 1st Baronet, of Chichester =

English politician

Sir Thomas Miller, 1st Baronet of Chichester (c. 1635–1705), of North Street, Chichester, Sussex, was an English politician.

He was a Member (MP) of the Parliament of England for Chichester in 1689 and 1690.

Parliament of England
Preceded by Sir Richard May; George Gounter	Member of Parliament for Chichester; 1689–1695; With: Thomas May	Succeeded by William Elson; The Earl of Ranelagh
Baronetage of England
New creation	Baronet (of Chichester); 1705	Succeeded by John Miller
