= Robert Bowyer (disambiguation) =

Robert Bowyer (1758–1834) was a British painter.

Robert Bowyer may also refer to:

- Robert Bowyer (died 1551/1552), MP for Chichester
- Robert Bowyer (died 1576), MP for Reading
- Robert Bowyer II (by 1529–1568/68), MP for Chichester in 1555 and 1558/9
- Robert Bowyer (diarist) (c. 1560–1621), English politician
