= Richard May =

Richard May may refer to:

- Richard May (judge) (1938–2004), British judge
- Richard May (cricketer) (died c. 1796), English cricketer for Kent
- Richard May (1863–1936), German physician who first described the May–Hegglin anomaly
- Richard May (politician) (c. 1638–1713), Member of Parliament for Chichester
- Richard May (speedway rider) (born 1944), British speedway rider
- Richard May, Apothecary to the Household at Windsor 1952–65
- Ricky May (1943–1988), New Zealand musician
- Dick May (1930–2009), NASCAR driver
- Dick May (footballer) (1910–1986), Australian rules footballer
