= Edward Dowse (MP) =

English politician

Edward Dowse (1582–1648) was an English politician who sat in the House of Commons from 1640 to 1648.

Dowse matriculated at Hart Hall, Oxford aged 15 on 14 October 1597, and was awarded BA on 8 May 1601 and MA on 8 May 1604. He was incorporated at Cambridge University in 1616.

In 1625 he was elected Member of Parliament for Cricklade, and in April 1626 for Chichester. In April 1640 he was again elected for Chichester in the Short Parliament. He was elected MP for Portsmouth in the Long Parliament in November 1640.

Dowse died in 1648.

Parliament of England
Preceded by Sir Neville Poole; Sir William Howard	Member of Parliament for Cricklade; 1625–1626; With: Sir William Howard	Succeeded by Sir William Howard; Sir Robert Hyde
Preceded by Algernon Lord Peircy; Humphrey Haggett	Member of Parliament for Chichester; 1626; With: Humphrey Haggett	Succeeded by William Cawley; Henry Bellingham
Vacant Parliament suspended since 1629	Member of Parliament for Chichester; 1640; With: Christopher Lewknor	Succeeded by Christopher Lewknor; Sir William Morley
Preceded by William Hamilton; Hon. Henry Percy	Member of Parliament for Portsmouth; 1640–1648; With: George Goring, Lord Goring 1640–1642; Edward Boote	Not represented in Rump Parliament
