= Hebbe =

Hebbe is a surname. Notable people with the surname include:

- Geoffrey Hebbe (fl.1413-1423), English politician
- John Hebbe (fl. 1397), English politician
- Signe Hebbe (1837–1925), Swedish singer (soprano), actress, and theatre pedagogue
- Wendela Hebbe (1808–1899), Swedish journalist, publicist and author, regarded as the first professional female journalist
- Henry Hebbe (1915–1985), Norwegian speed skater
- Kastyn Hebbe (1999-present), American Physician's Assistant

== See also ==
- Hebbe Falls, a waterfall in Karnataka, India
