= Christopher Lewknor =

English politician

Christopher Lewknor (24 February 1598 – 1653) was an English politician who sat in the House of Commons variously between 1628 and 1641. He supported the Royalist side in the English Civil War.

== Family and early life ==
Lewknor was the fourth son of Richard Lewknor of West Dean, Sussex, and his wife Eleanor Broome, daughter of Sir Christopher Brome of Holton, Oxfordshire. His eldest brother, Richard Lewknor, also served as a Member of Parliament. Lewknor's father died in 1603, when Christopher was around five years old. His mother subsequently married Sir William Oglander and had other children, among whom was the future politician and diarist Sir John Oglander. Lewknor received an annuity of £20 from his grandfather, Sir Richard Lewknor, the chief justice of Chester.

Christopher followed his grandfather into the legal profession, receiving his education at the Middle Temple from 1617, and being called to its bar in 1625. This was in spite of having gained a reputation as belonging to a group at the Temple notorious for being ‘exceeding riotous and dissolute swaggerers and professed duellists and champions’. In 1621 he was one of the group to be accused in a Star Chamber case of trying to provoke an older man into a fight. Lewknor was defended by Thomas Whatman in the case. After his call to the bar, Lewknor served, like his grandfather, as counsel to the Percy family.

== Parliamentary career ==
In 1628 Lewknor was elected Member of Parliament for Midhurst and held the seat until 1629 when King Charles decided to rule without parliament for eleven years. He, like his brother Richard, made little contribution to the business of parliament, though he made notes on its progress.

In 1636 Lewknor was appointed to a commission for better preservation of timber in view of the growth of the Sussex iron trade. By the early 1630s he was recorder of Chichester. In April 1640, he was elected MP for Chichester in the Short Parliament. He was re-elected MP for Chichester in November 1640 for the Long Parliament and sat until he was disabled as a Royalist in 1642. He went over to the Royalist side, was commissioned in the King's army and attended the Oxford Parliament. He became Doctor of Civil Law at Oxford in 1642.

In August 1642 Lewknor supported Chichester mayor Robert Exton when he issued the Royal Commission of Array, calling upon all able-bodied men to take arms for the king; in response to the city's "Valiant Resolution to stand for the privileges of Parliament, the Protestant religion, the laws of the land, and the liberty of the people". Lewknor was styled "the man appointed by his Majesty to take in money and plate on his behalfe" and on 28 August 1642, he took part in a parley between the besiegers of Portsmouth and the beleaguered garrison. In January 1643 he was a prisoner at Windsor Castle. He was knighted on 18 December 1644. He appears to have been present at the siege of Salcombe Castle in early 1646, when a Parliamentarian recorded that ‘Kit Lukener the great trencher man being therein, is afraid he shall be starved’. In 1651, parliament ordered his lands to be sold.

== Later years ==
Lewknor drew up his will on 1 July 1653, in which he describes himself as being ‘sick in body’. He presumably died shortly afterwards, as on 5 September Sir Edward Hyde could observe that he had been ‘dead these many months’. He had married Mary, daughter of John May of Rawmere, on 7 May 1619. She was the widow of William Smyth of Binderton, Sussex. The couple had two daughters before Mary's death in 1642. Christopher Lewknor died without any male heirs, though two of his grandsons entered parliament, Christopher Knight for Arundel in 1698 and William Knight for Midhurst in 1713.

Parliament of England
| Preceded by Richard Lewknor; Sir Henry Spiller | Member of Parliament for Midhurst; 1628–1629; With: Edward Savage | Parliament suspended until 1640 |
| Vacant Parliament suspended since 1629 | Member of Parliament for Chichester; 1640–1642; With: Edward Dowse; Sir William Morley | Succeeded by Sir John Temple; Henry Peck |
