= William Hore =

William Hore may refer to:

- William Bernie Hore, Australian rules footballer
- William Hore (Chichester MP) (fl 1420), MP for Chichester
- William Hore (died 1741) (c 1679–1741), MP for County Wexford
- William Hore (Taghmon MP) (c 1700–1746), MP for Taghmon

== See also ==
- William S. Hoar, zoologist
- William Hoare (disambiguation)
