= Ardern (surname) =

Ardern (pronounced /ˈɑːrdərn/ AR-dərn, /ˈɑːrdɜːrn/ AR-durn or /ɑːrˈdɜːrn/ ar-DURN) is a surname of English origin.

Notable people with the surname include:

- Barry Ardern (born 1946), Canadian football player
- Jacinda Ardern (born 1980), the 40th prime minister of New Zealand
- Lawrence Ardern (1523–1570), English politician
- Ross Ardern (born 1954), New Zealand diplomat and the father of Jacinda Ardern
- Shane Ardern (born 1960), New Zealand politician
