= Digon (disambiguation) =

A digon, in mathematics, is a polygon or a graph with two vertices.

Digon or Digons may also refer to:

== Places ==
- Digon, a small municipality in Margosatubig, Zamboanga del Sur, the Philippines
- Digon valley, a valley in Comelico, Italy
- Digons or Bigons, an estate acquired by English lawyer and politician Nicholas Barham in 1554

== People ==
- John Digons (1500 or 1501–1585), English politician
- Josep Digón i Balaguer (1954-1995), a leader of the Catalan Liberation Front separatist group
- Roberto Digón (born 1935), Argentine politician - see Noemí Rial

== Other uses ==
- Digon, a trade name of digoxin, a medication
