= Thomas Hayne =

Thomas Hayne may refer to:

- Thomas Hayne (theologian), English schoolmaster and theologian
- Thomas Hayne (MP) for Chichester
- Thomas Hayne, character in Actor's and Sin

== See also ==
- Thomas Haynes (disambiguation)
- Tom Haine (1933–1994), member of the Volleyball Hall of Fame
