= Edward Cecil, 1st Viscount Wimbledon =

English military commander (1572–1638)

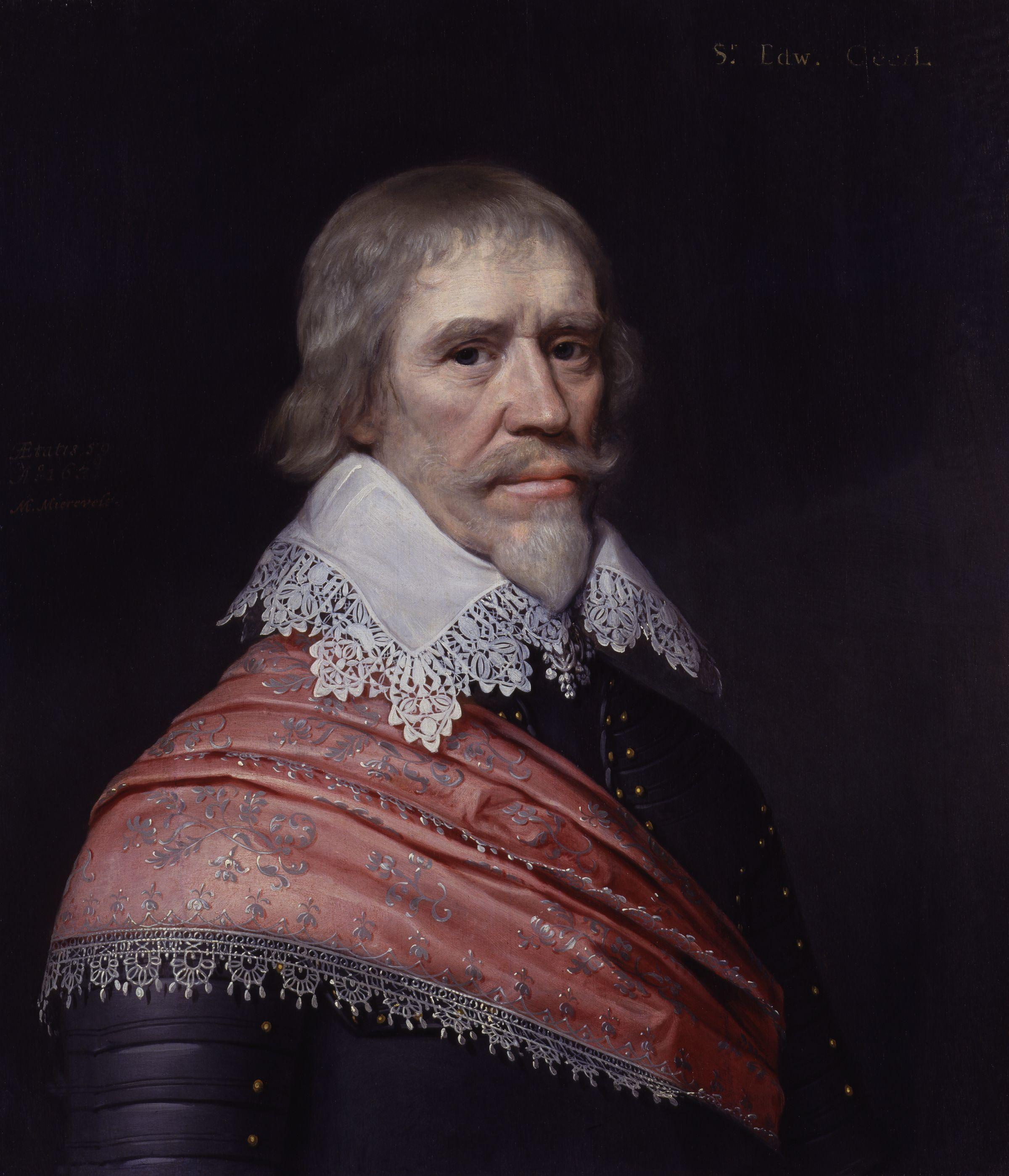
The Viscount Wimbledon (Michiel Jansz. van Miereveldt, 1631)

Edward Cecil, 1st Viscount Wimbledon (29 February 1572 – 16 November 1638) was an English military commander and a politician who sat in the House of Commons at various times between 1601 and 1624.

== Life ==
Cecil was the third son of Thomas Cecil, 1st Earl of Exeter, and his wife, Dorothy Neville, daughter of John Neville, 4th Baron Latimer, by his wife, Lucy Somerset, daughter of Henry Somerset, 2nd Earl of Worcester. He was a grandson of Queen Elizabeth's great minister William Cecil, 1st Baron Burghley.

Cecil served with the English forces in the Netherlands between 1596 and 1610, becoming a captain of foot in 1599. In May 1600 he was appointed to a troop of cavalry, which he commanded at the battle of Nieuport, under Sir Francis Vere. In 1601 he commanded a body of one thousand men raised in London for the relief of Ostend, then besieged by the Spanish, and on his return in September was knighted by Queen Elizabeth. He was elected Member of Parliament for Aldborough in 1601. In the spring of 1602, he was colonel of a regiment of English horse under Prince Maurice, and served in the expedition into Brabant and at the Siege of Grave. He commanded the English cavalry during the conquest of Sluis in 1604 during which he played a part in defeating the relief attempt by Ambrogio Spinola. He continued actively serving during the years immediately following, and made his reputation as a soldier. In 1610 he commanded the British and Irish contingent of four thousand men serving under Prince Christian of Anhalt in the War of the Jülich succession, at the siege of Juliers in July and August. This was the first ever army flagged as British under the Union Flag.

At court, his credit also stood high. In March 1612 he was sent, as the prince's proxy, to stand sponsor at the baptism of Henry Casimir, son of Count Ernest of Nassau, and Sophia Hedwig, niece of Anne of Denmark, at Arnhem. Cecil gave gifts of a cupboard of gilt plate, a diamond necklace with a locket, horses, and an embroidered petticoat for Sophia Hedwig. In April 1613 he had a commission to receive and pay all money for the journey of Lady Elizabeth and her husband, and in November he was ordered to request his lady to attend the electress at Heidelberg. In January 1618 he sued in vain for the comptrollership, and in February for the chancellorship of the duchy of Lancaster. In 1620 he was nominated by George Villiers, 1st Duke of Buckingham to command the English troops in Germany, but was superseded by Sir Horace Vere on the demand of Count Dohna, the agent of the king of Bohemia in England. A quarrel ensued between Cecil and Dohna, in the course of which Cecil assured his opponent that it was only his character as an ambassador which protected him from a demand for personal satisfaction. He was elected MP for Chichester in 1621. He supported Sir James Perrot's call on the House of Commons of England to commit to military support for the Palatinate in the early stages of the Thirty Years' War saying "This declaration comes from heaven. It will do more for us than if we had ten thousand soldiers on the march." In 1624 he was elected MP for Dover.

Cecil was given command of Buckingham's military expedition to Spain in October 1625, but so mismanaged the attack on Cadiz that he entirely missed the treasure ships which were the main objective of the attack. Nevertheless, in the following month, November 1625, he was raised to the peerage as Baron Cecil of Putney and Viscount Wimbledon, on the basis of his seat, Wimbledon House in Surrey. He returned to command the English forces in the Netherlands from 1627 (the Siege of Groenlo) until 1629 (the Siege of 's-Hertogenbosch). He served as Lord Lieutenant of Surrey from 1627 to 1638 and was Governor of Portsmouth from 1630 to 1638. He remained highly placed in the military establishment.

== Family ==
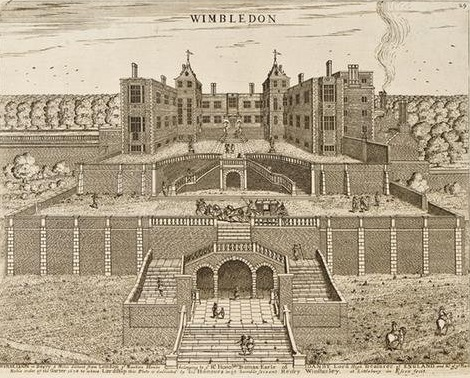
Wimbledon Palace, Edward's home. Built 1588

Cecil married three times. He married firstly in 1601 to Theodosia Noel (born 1585), daughter of Sir Andrew Noel of Dalby and Mabel Harington. They had five daughters; (1) Dorothy (1603–1652), who died unmarried, (2) Albinia (died 1660), who married Sir Christopher Wray of Ashby, (3) Elizabeth, who married Francis Willoughby, 5th Baron Willoughby of Parham, (4) Frances (died 1684), who married first James Fiennes, 2nd Viscount Saye and Sele and second the Reverend Joshua Sprigge and (5) Utriche, baptised 20 March 1616 in Utrecht, probably named after Utrecht and probably died early.

Following the death of his first wife, in February 1618 he married Diana Drury (d. 1631), daughter of Sir William Drury of Hawstead, Suffolk, and Elizabeth Stafford. Their only child, Anne, died in infancy. Cecil married thirdly, in 1635, Sophia Zouche (c. 1618–1691), daughter of Sir Edward Zouch of Woking and Dorothy Silking, by whom he had a son, Algernon, but this child also died aged less than a year old.

== Death ==
Wimbledon died in 1638 and is buried in the Cecil Chapel at St Mary's Church, Wimbledon. Both his titles became extinct on his death. Sophia remarried the Irish statesman Sir Robert King, with whom she had a daughter.

== See also ==
- Wimbledon Palace – Edward Cecil's home, which was built by his father Sir Thomas Cecil in 1588.

== Notes ==
Parliament of England
Preceded by Henry Bellasis; Richard Gargrave	Member of Parliament for Aldborough; 1601–1611; With: Richard Theakston; Sir Henry Savile	Succeeded by Sir Henry Savile; George Wetherid
Preceded by Adrian Stoughton; Sir John Morley	Member of Parliament for Chichester; 1621–1622; With: Thomas Whatman	Succeeded by Sir Thomas Edmondes; Thomas Whatman
Preceded by Sir Henry Mainwaring; Sir Richard Young	Member of Parliament for Dover; 1624; With: Sir Richard Young	Succeeded by Sir John Hippisley; William Beecher
Honorary titles
Preceded by The Earl of Nottingham; The Earl of Holderness	Lord Lieutenant of Surrey jointly with The Earl of Nottingham 1627–1638; The Earl of Arundel 1635–1638; Lord Maltravers 1636–1638; 1627–1638	Succeeded by The Earl of Nottingham; The Earl of Arundel; Lord Maltravers
Peerage of England
New creation	Viscount Wimbledon; 1625–1638	Extinct
