= Robert Bowyer (died 1551 or 1552) =

English politician

Robert Bowyer (by 1502 – 1551 or 1552), of Chichester, Sussex, was an English politician. He served as Mayor of Chichester and Member of Parliament.

Robert Bowyer was the second son of William Bowyer, bailiff of Petworth in Sussex, a property of the powerful Percy earls of Northumberland.

Bowyer was a Member of Parliament for Chichester in 1529 and 1547. He may have served additional terms, but the records for the period are incomplete. He served multiple times as Mayor of Chichester, in 1527–8, 1532–3, 1541–2, 1546–7, and possibly again in 1551.

Bowyer and his wife Margaret had six sons and five daughters. Their son William became Keeper of the Records in the Tower of London and was an MP for Westminster. Their son Robert followed his father as MP for Chichester.
