= Patching (surname) =

Patching is a surname. Notable people with the surname include:

- George Patching (1886–1944), South African sprinter
- Glenn Patching (born 1958), Australian swimmer
- Julius Patching (1917–2009), Australian sports administrator
- Martin Patching (1958–2023), English footballer
- Thomas Patching, (fl. 1386–1408) English politician
- Will Patching (born 1998), English footballer
