= Richard Lewknor =

English politician

Richard Lewknor (c. 1589 – 27 May 1635) was an English politician who sat in the House of Commons as a Member of Parliament (MP) between 1621 and 1629.

== Family ==
Lewknor was the son of Richard Lewknor, of West Dean, Sussex, and Eleanor, daughter of Christopher Brome of Holton, Oxfordshire. He was the elder brother of Christopher Lewknor, also an MP. He came into possession of the family manor of West Dean on the death of his grandfather Richard Lewknor in 1616.

== Career ==
In 1621, Lewknor was elected MP for Midhurst. He was re-elected in 1624, 1625, and 1626. In 1628, he was elected MP for Sussex.

He wife was Mary Bennet, daughter of Thomas Bennet. They had a son, who was also an MP.

Lewknor died on 27 May 1635. He was buried at West Dean.

Parliament of England
Preceded by Thomas Bowyer; William Courteman	Member of Parliament for Midhurst; 1621–1626; With: John Smith 1621–1622; Sir Anthony Manie 1624; Samuel Owfield 1625; Sir Henry Spiller 1626	Succeeded by Christopher Lewknor; Edward Savage
Preceded by Sir Walter Covert; Sir Alexander Temple	Member of Parliament for Sussex; 1628–1629; With: Sir William Goring, 1st Baronet	Parliament suspended until 1640
