= William Bowyer (Keeper of the Records) =

English MP (died 1596/70)

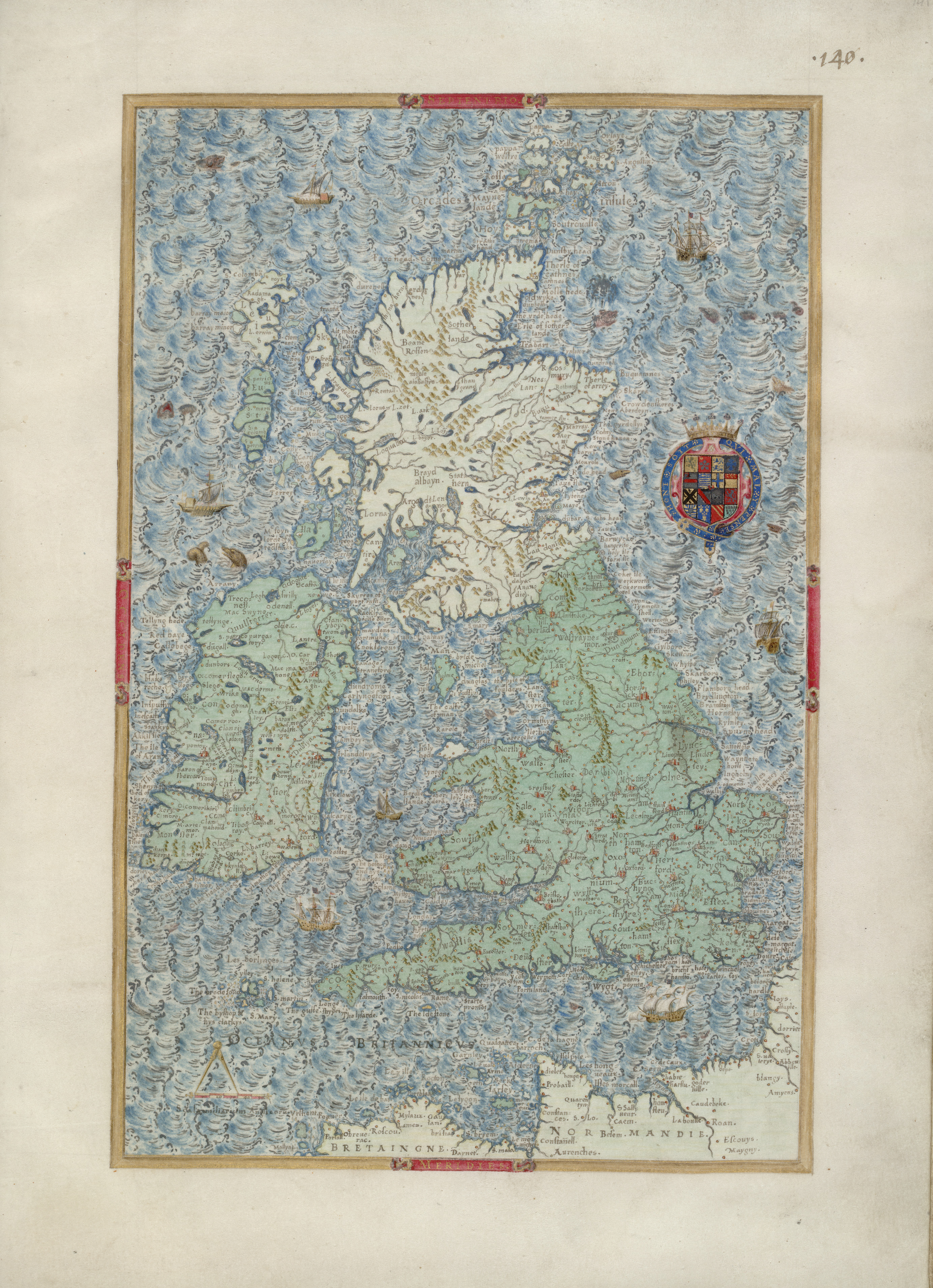
Map of the British Isles from Heroica Eulogia by William Bowyer, 1567

William Bowyer (d. 1569/1570) was an English antiquary and government official who was a Member of Parliament and Keeper of the Records in the Tower of London early in the reign of Queen Elizabeth I. He was the first Keeper to systematically organise and catalogue the store of government records maintained in the Tower. An avid collector of old manuscripts, he also created Heroica Eulogia, a compilation of grants and verse eulogies relating to the earls of Leicester, along with satirical verses and illustrations, for presentation to Robert Dudley, Earl of Leicester.

== Early life ==
William Bowyer was a son of Robert Bowyer, merchant and four-time mayor of Chichester, Sussex, and his wife Margaret. Little is known of William's life before 1553, when he followed his older brother Robert into the Middle Temple.

William married Agnes, daughter of Sir John Harcourt (d. 1566) of Oxfordshire and Staffordshire, the widow of John Knyvet of Ashwellthorpe, Norfolk. They had three children:

- William (died young)
- Robert (d. 1621)
- Judith, married Richard Highgate

== Career ==
William Bowyer was appointed Bailiff of Westminster in 1560, probably with the support of Sir Thomas Parry. In this capacity, Bowyer advised Sir William Cecil as to the gifts expected of him in his new role of High Steward of Westminster Abbey (1561).

In 1563, probably with the good graces of Cecil, Bowyer attained the position of Keeper of the Records in the Tower of London, although he did not receive a formal patent for the office until 18 June 1567. As Keeper, Bowyer was responsible for the vast store of government records accumulated in the Tower since the reign of William the Conqueror. During his tenure, Bowyer created the first systematic arrangement of the records. At a cost later estimated at some £1000, Bowyer produced a six-volume overview of all the documents under his management, including "digests of the parliament, patent, charter, close, and foreign rolls, from the reigns of King John to Edward IV (now in the College of Arms), as well as a list of escheats, a medieval roll of arms and a heraldic commonplace book."

Bowyer sat as Member of Parliament for Westminster in Elizabeth's second Parliament (1563) and was named Justice of the Peace for Surrey in 1564.

== Antiquary ==
Bowyer was an avid collector of old manuscripts. Among the manuscripts he acquired were "the Rievaulx Abbey copy of Roger of Howden's Chronica, the C manuscript of the Anglo-Saxon Chronicle, William of Malmesbury's De antiquitate Glastoniensis ecclesiae, Ranulf Higden's Polychronicon, and Laurence Nowell's transcription of the Vita et mors Edwardi secundi (part of Geoffrey le Baker's chronicle)."

== Heroica Eulogia ==
In 1567, Bowyer compiled Heroica Eulogia, a manuscript collection of historical grants and deeds relating to the earls of Leicester dedicated to Robert Dudley, the newly created earl. The historical documents are accompanied by illustrated vignettes in verse of previous earls and of the kings who granted the charters, along with satiric anticlerical verses justifying the Dissolution of the Monasteries. The manuscript contains heraldic devices, a map of the British Isles, and calligraphic passages by John de Beauchesne.

The scholar Norman Jones suggests that the purpose of the Heroica Eulogia was to build a case for the worthiness of Robert Dudley to be consort to Elizabeth I. The manuscript is unfinished and it is uncertain whether it was ever presented to Leicester. The manuscript was acquired by Henry E. Huntington in 1912 and is now housed at the Huntington Library.

== Death ==
Bowyer died sometime in 1569 or early 1570. His will, dated 15 April 1569, was proved on 23 June 1570. He was survived by his widow, who was named his executor, and his three children. His own writings were left to his elder son William (who died young), and his historical and heraldic manuscripts to his second son Robert, who became Keeper of the Records in 1604.

Parliament of England
Preceded by Richard Hodges; John Best	Member of Parliament for Westminster; 1563–1567; With: Robert Nowell	Succeeded by William Cordell; William Staunton
