= John Temple (judge) =

Anglo-Irish lawyer, courtier and politician

Sir John Temple (1600 – 14 November 1677) was an Anglo-Irish lawyer, courtier and politician who sat in the Irish House of Commons at various times between 1641 and 1677 and in the House of Commons of England from 1646 to 1648. He was Master of the Rolls in Ireland.

== Background and education ==
Temple was born in Ireland, the son of Sir William Temple, provost of Trinity College Dublin, and his wife Martha Harrison, daughter of Robert Harrison of Derbyshire. He was educated at Trinity College Dublin and spent some time travelling abroad. On his return he entered the personal service of Charles I and was knighted.

== Legal career ==
Temple returned to Ireland and on 31 January 1640 succeeded Sir Christopher Wandesford as Master of the Rolls in Ireland and was admitted to the Privy Council of Ireland. When the Irish Rebellion of 1641 broke out in October he served the government in provisioning the city. On 23 July 1642, he was elected Member of the Irish House of Commons for County Meath, being described as of Ballycrath, County Carlow. He tended to support the Parliamentary side and in August 1643 he was suspended from his office by the Lords Justices, Sir John Borlase and Sir Henry Tichborne, acting on instructions from King Charles. He was imprisoned in Dublin Castle with Sir William Parsons, Sir Adam Loftus, and Sir Robert Meredyth. The main charge against him was of writing in May and June two scandalous letters against the King, which suggested the King had favoured the rebels.

After a year's imprisonment he was exchanged, and in 1645 was chosen MP for Chichester in the Long Parliament of the English House of Commons in compensation for the harsh treatment he had undergone. He received special thanks for the services he had rendered to the English interest in Ireland at the beginning of the rebellion.

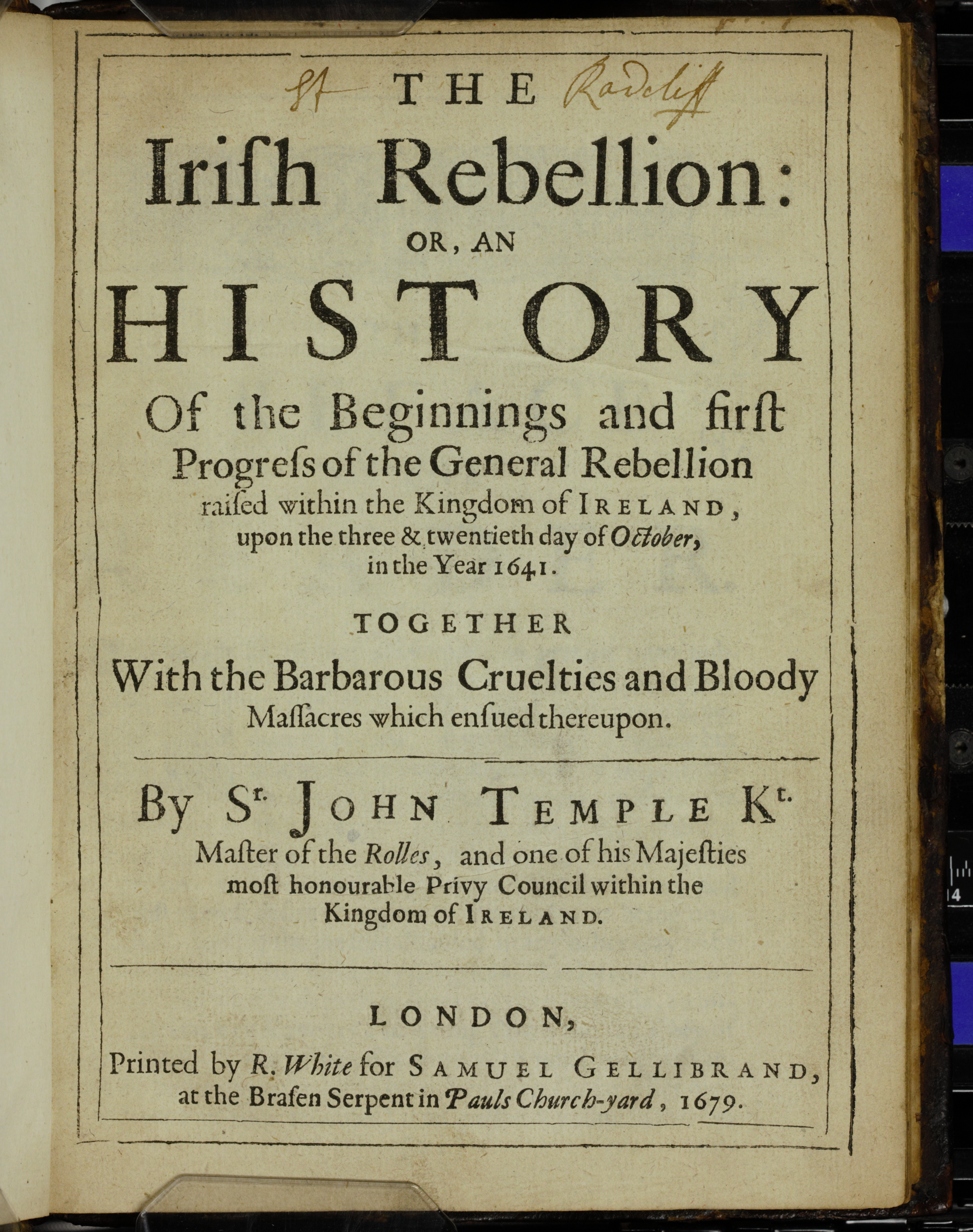
Title page of "The Irish Rebellion," authored in 1641. Digitized by the University of Notre Dame Hesburgh Libraries.

== History of the Irish Rebellion ==
In 1646 Temple published his Irish Rebellion; or an history of the beginning and first progresse of the generall rebellion raised within the kingdom of Ireland upon the … 23 Oct. 1641. Together with the barbarous cruelties and bloody massacres which ensued thereupon, which created an immediate and great sensation. Its statements were received with unquestioning confidence, as the work of a professed eye-witness who could speak with authority, and did much to inflame popular indignation in Britain against the Irish. Subsequently, the truth of many of its statements have been questioned and it became viewed as a partisan pamphlet rather than an historical treatise. Temple's Irish Rebellion was often praised by authors hostile to Roman Catholicism, including John Milton and Voltaire. The Irish were so incensed against the book that one of the first resolutions of the Patriot Parliament of 1689 was to order it to be burnt by the common hangman.

== Interregnum ==
In 1647, after peace was concluded between Ormonde and Parliament, Temple was appointed a commissioner for the government of Munster, and on 16 October 1648 was made joint commissioner with Sir William Parsons for the administration of the Great Seal of Ireland. However, he voted with the majority on 5 December 1648 in favour of the proposed compromise with King Charles, and was excluded from Parliament under Pride's Purge. For the next four years he took no part in public affairs, living quietly in London.

As a result of his personal experience of the outbreak of the Irish Rebellion, Temple was appointed on 21 November 1653 as a commissioner "to consider and advise from time to time how the titles of the Irish and others to any estate in Ireland, and likewise their delinquency according to their respective qualifications, might be put in the most speedy and exact way of adjudication consistent with justice". When this work was completed, he returned to England in 1654, and, expressed his willingness to resume the regular execution of his old office of Master of the Rolls. In June 1655, he returned to Ireland with a highly recommendatory letter in his favour from Cromwell addressed to the Lord Deputy of Ireland, Charles Fleetwood and the Council of State. He received an increased official salary, and from time to time was given several grants of money for special services rendered by him. In September 1654 he was joined with Sir R. King, Benjamin Worsley, and others in a commission for letting and setting of houses and lands belonging to the state in the counties of Dublin, Kildare, and Carlow, and on 13 June 1656 he was appointed a commissioner for determining all differences among the adventurers concerning lands, etc. In recompense for his services he received on 6 July 1658 a grant of two leases for twenty-one years, the one comprising the town and lands of Moyle, Castletown, Park, etc., adjoining the town of Carlow, amounting to about 1,490 acres, in part afterwards confirmed to him under the Act of Settlement 1662 on 18 June 1666; the other of certain lands in the barony of Balrothery West, Co. Dublin, to which were added those of Lispoble (or Lispopple) in the same county on 30 March 1659 for a similar term of years. He obtained license to go to England for a whole year or more on 21 April 1659.

== Restoration ==
At the Restoration of Charles II in 1660, Temple was confirmed in his office of Master of the Rolls, sworn a member of the Privy Council, appointed a trustee for the '49 officers, and on 4 May 1661 was elected, with his eldest son Sir William Temple, 1st Baronet, to represent County Carlow in Parliament. On 6 May he obtained for the payment of a fine of £540, a reversionary lease from the queen mother Henrietta Maria of the park of Blandesby or Blansby, Pickering, Yorkshire, for a term of forty years. He received a confirmation in perpetuity of his lands in Co. Dublin, including those of Palmerstown, under the Act of Settlement on 29 July 1666; to which were added on 20 May 1669 others in counties Kilkenny, Meath, Westmeath, and Dublin. Other grants followed, including 144 acres formerly belonging to the Phoenix Park on 3 May 1672, and certain lands, fishings, etc., in and near Chapelizod on 16 November 1675. He was appointed Vice-Treasurer of Ireland in 1673.

== Family ==
Temple died in 1677, and was buried beside his father in Trinity College near the campanile, having that year made a benefaction of £100 to the college to be laid out in certain buildings, entitling him and his heirs to bestow two handsome chambers upon such students as they desired.

Temple married Mary Hammond, daughter of Dr. John Hammond, of Chertsey, Surrey. She died at Penshurst in Kent in November 1638. They had in addition to two sons and a daughter who died young:

- Sir William Temple, 1st Baronet, the distinguished diplomat
- Sir John Temple, Attorney General for Ireland
- Martha, Lady Giffard (1638-1722), correspondent and first biographer of her brother William and his son.

Parliament of England
Preceded by Christopher Lewknor; Sir William Morley	Member of Parliament for Chichester; 1646–1648; With: Henry Peck	Succeeded by Not represented in Rump Parliament
