= Roynon =

Roynon is a surname. Notable people with the surname include:

- Adam Roynon (born 1988), British motorcycle speedway rider
- Walter Roynon, 16th-century English politician
