= William Hoare (disambiguation) =

William Hoare (c. 1707–1792) was an English artist.

William Hoare may also refer to:

- William Hoare (gymnast), British gymnast
- William Hoare (cricketer, born 1847), English cricketer
- William Hoare (cricketer, born 1868), Australian cricketer
- William Henry Hoare (1809–1888), English cleric and author
- William Hoare (physician) (died 1666) on List of fellows of the Royal Society G, H, I

== See also ==
- William S. Hoar (1913–2006), professor of zoology
- William Hore (disambiguation)
