= List of mayors of Chichester =

The following have been mayors of Chichester, Sussex:

- William Combe 1390–91 MP for Chichester, 1382, 1384 and 1401
- William Neel 1393–95, 1401–02 MP for Chichester, 1388, 1399 and 1415.
- William Horlebat 1398–99. MP for Chichester, 1388
- Thomas Patching 1407–08 MP for Chichester, 1486–1499
- William Hore 1422–23, 1427–29, 1432–33, 1436–37, 1439–40, 1444–45, 1446–48. MP for Chichester, 1420 and 1431
- John Digons 1548–49 MP for Chichester, 1554
- Richard Knight 1554–55 MP for Chichester, 1555
- John Digons 1556–57 and 1567–68
- Lawrence Ardren 1564 MP for Chichester, 1558
- Charles Lennox, 2nd Duke of Richmond 1735–36
- Lord George Lennox 1772–73
- Charles Buckner 1783–84
- Sir George Murray 1815 Vice-admiral, Royal Navy
- R. C. Miller 1900
- Leslie Evershed-Martin 1955–57 Founder of Chichester Festival Theatre
- 1969 S.J Watson

== 21st century ==
Source:List of Mayors of Chichester

- Peggie Frost 2000–01
- Michael Shone 2001–02
- David Siggs 2002–03
- Jean E. Le Bourlier-Woods 2003–04
- Michael Shone 2004–05
- Richard E. Plowman 2005–06
- J. Rob Campling 2006–07
- Raymond E. Brown 2007–08
- David Siggs 2008–09
- Michael Woolley 2009–11
- Anthony J. French 2011–12
- Anne Scicluna 2012–13
- Alan Chaplin 2013 (resigned December 2013 and replaced by John F Hughes
- John F Hughes 2014–15
- Peter Budge 2015–16
