= Thomas Stoughton =

16th-century English politician

Thomas Stoughton (25 March 1521 – 12 June 1591), of Stoughton, Surrey and West Stoke, Sussex, was an English politician.

== Family ==
The Stoughton family had long sat in Parliament for this area. Stoughton was the son of Lawrence Stoughton of Stoughton and Anne née Combes of Guildford. Stoughton married twice, first to Anne Fleming from London, no recorded children. His second wife, whom he married on 27 February 1553, was Elizabeth Lewknor of Tangmere, Sussex. They had two sons, both MPs: his heir Sir Laurence (who represented Guildford) and Adrian (for Haslemere and Chichester), as well as two daughters.

== Career ==
Stoughton was a Member of Parliament for Chichester in March 1553, October 1553, April 1554 and 1563. He represented Guildford in 1547, 1559 and 1572.
