= Thomas Carpenter (MP) =

16th-century English politician

Thomas Carpenter (by 1520 – 1565 or later), of St. Pancras without the Walls, Chichester, Sussex, was an English politician.

Carpenter was a member of parliament for Arundel in 1547 and Chichester in March 1553, October 1553 and April 1554.
