= 1942 Chichester by-election =

UK Parliamentary by-election

The 1942 Chichester by-election was held on 18 May 1942. It was held due to the death of the incumbent Conservative MP, John Courtauld. It was won by the Conservative candidate Lancelot Joynson-Hicks.

== Candidates ==
Under the wartime electoral truce between the Coalition government parties, Conservative candidate Lt-Cmr. Joynson-Hicks could not expect to be opposed by Labour candidates nor Liberals. He was instead opposed by two independents: A.W. Tribe and Fl-Lt. Gerald Kidd. Before the outbreak of war, Kidd had been adopted by Chichester Liberal association as their candidate for a general election expected to take place in 1939/40. Kidd was a local solicitor who joined the RAF in 1940. The chairman of the Bognor Regis Conservative Club invited to hear the views of all three at the Club in the campaign period, whom he stated were "All conservatives...Tribe...a former secretary...Kidd...worked in the Conservative interest some years ago, but is not a member". The NFU had them address its committee and "having heard the three candidates and asked questions of them, we make no recommendations to our members". The heading "Liberal leader's message" then featured in The Times, endorsing Joynson-Hicks. Kidd was allowed to allege incompetence allowed key German warships the Gneisenau and Scharnhorst through the Channel (recently to Norway/Germany) and that he would if allowed by the RAF join the Merchant Navy, if not elected, "whose task [had] been made the more perilous"

The Times reported the outcome as "Chichester held by Government".

Kidd survived the war and polled third in the 1945 election, taking 1/5 of the vote, about half that of 1942, but again enough to keep his deposit.

== Result ==
Chichester by-election, 1942
| Party | Candidate | Votes | % | ±% |
|---|---|---|---|---|
| Conservative | Lancelot Joynson-Hicks | 15,634 | 58.1 | −20.2 |
| Independent Progressive | Gerald Kidd | 10,564 | 39.3 | New |
| National | A. A. W. Tribe | 706 | 2.6 | New |
| Majority | | 5,070 | 18.8 | −37.8 |
| Turnout | | 26,904 | 29.2 | −30.3 |
| Conservative hold | | Swing | | |
