= Richard Knight (MP) =

English politician of the 16th century

Richard Knight (by 1518 – 1555 or later), of Chichester, Sussex, was an English politician.

Knight was Mayor of Chichester for 1554 and elected member of parliament for Chichester in 1555.
