= John Cok =

English politician

John Cok (fl. 1420) of Chichester, Sussex, was an English politician.

He was a member (MP) of the parliament of England for Chichester in 1420.
