= Anthony Nelson (politician) =

British politician (born 1948)

Minister of State for Trade
- In office 6 July 1995 – 2 May 1997
- Prime Minister: John Major
- Preceded by: Richard Needham
- Succeeded by: Stanley Clinton-Davis, Baron Clinton-Davis

Economic Secretary to the Treasury
- In office 14 April 1992 – 6 July 1995
- Prime Minister: John Major
- Preceded by: John Maples
- Succeeded by: Angela Knight

Member of Parliament for Chichester
- In office 10 October 1974 – 8 April 1997
- Preceded by: Christopher Chataway
- Succeeded by: Andrew Tyrie

Personal details
- Born: 11 June 1948 (age 78) Hamburg, Germany
- Party: Labour (Since 2001); Conservative (Until 2001)
- Spouse: Caroline Butler (m. 1974)
- Children: 2
- Education: Harrow School; Christ's College, Cambridge
- Profession: Politician, banker

Richard Anthony Nelson (born 11 June 1948) is a former British politician and banker. He was educated at Harrow School, where he was head of school, and Christ's College, Cambridge, where he gained a MA (Hons) in economics and law. Having unsuccessfully stood for Leeds East in February 1974, he was elected Conservative member of parliament for Chichester in October 1974 at the unusually young age of 26, and remained in that office until he stood down at the 1997 general election and resumed a career in banking as Vice Chairman of Citigroup.

== Political career ==
In 1988, as a backbencher Nelson introduced a successful private members bill to televise the House of Commons despite Margaret Thatcher being against the move. Initially this was for an 18-month trial period before becoming permanent after support from key parliamentarians (including the Deputy speaker Betty Boothroyd). He also introduced a number of amendments to legislation enhancing the protection of investors, depositors and policy holders. As a Minister, Nelson was responsible for economic and monetary policy as well as supervision of the financial services industry under successive Chancellors of the Exchequer, Norman Lamont and Kenneth Clarke. As Minister for Trade and Industry, he was responsible for export policy and promotion as well as the Reconstruction and Renewal of Lloyd's of London.

Before joining Parliament, Nelson founded the Action Group for Penal Reform, was a founder member of the National Victims Association and a member of the Council of the Howard League. In Parliament, he served as a member of the Select Committee on Science and Technology 1975–79. He was Parliamentary Private Secretary to the Minister for Housing and Construction 1979–1983 and to the Minister for the Armed Forces 1983–85. He was Economic Secretary to the Treasury 1992–94; Minister of State at the Treasury 1994–5; and Minister of State at the Department for Trade and Industry 1995–97.

An ardent pro-European in and out of Parliament, Nelson took over from Lord Marshall of Knightsbridge as Chairman of Britain in Europe in 2004.

== Business career ==
After leaving Cambridge in 1969, Nelson joined the merchant bank, N M Rothschild & Sons, where he worked as an asset manager and research analyst. He was a director on the board of the Chichester Festival Theatre 1982−92. After leaving government and parliament in 1997, he joined Schroder Salomon Smith Barney as a managing director and was appointed vice chairman of Citigroup 2000−08. He was chairman of Southern Water 2002-04 and chairman of Gateway to London, a public private partnership engaged in the regeneration of East London, 2002−08.

Nelson was also a governor of the Chartered Institute of Bankers (now the Institute of Financial Services); a director of International Financial Services London (now TheCityUK) and a member of the governing body of the International Chamber of Commerce UK. He is a fellow of the Royal Society of Arts, Manufactures and Commerce.

== Personal life ==
Anthony Nelson is the son of the late Group Captain Gordon Nelson and Mrs J.M. Nelson. He was born in Hamburg, Germany. In 1974, he married Caroline Victoria Butler and they have two children, Charlotte-Anne (b 1979) and Carlton (b 1981), both of whom are married.

Parliament of the United Kingdom
Preceded by Christopher Chataway	Member of Parliament for Chichester; October 1974 – 1997	Succeeded by Andrew Tyrie
