= William Farnhurst =

English politician

William Farnhurst (fl. 1415–1422) of Chichester, Sussex, was an English politician.

He was a member (MP) of the parliament of England for Chichester in 1415, March 1416, May 1421 and 1422.
