= John Sherwin (MP) =

16th-century English politician

- Born: 1527
- Died: 1589 (aged 61–62)
- Occupation: English politician.

John Sherwin (c.1527–89), was an English politician.

He was a member (MP) of the parliament of England for Chichester in 1563, and Mayor of the borough in 1570.
