= Michael Heneage =

16th-century English politician and antiquary

Michael Heneage (1540–1600) was an English politician and antiquary. He was the Member of Parliament for Arundel, East Grinstead, Tavistock and Wigan.

== Life ==
He was a younger brother of Thomas Heneage, and was elected Fellow of St John's College, Cambridge, in 1563 (B.A. 1562–3, M.A. 1566).

He was chosen M.P. for Arundel in 1571, for East Grinstead in 1572, for Tavistock in February 1588–9, and for Wigan in February 1592–3. With his brother Thomas, Michael was appointed a keeper of the records in the Tower of London about 1578.

He lived for many years in the parish of St Catharine Coleman, London, but also possessed some landed property, mainly in Essex. He died on 30 December 1600, having married, on 12 August 1577, Grace, daughter of Robert Honeywood of Charing, Kent. She survived him, and by her, he had a family of ten children.

== Works ==
He was a member of the Society of Antiquaries, and two papers by him read before the society—‘of the Antiquity of Arms in England,’ and ‘of Sterling Money’—were printed by Thomas Hearne. A manuscript by him, ‘Collections out of various Charters, &c., relating to the Noble Families in England,’ is in the Cottonian Library (Claudius C.I.).

The University of Cambridge thanked him for the assistance he rendered to Robert Hare, the compiler of the university records, and Thomas Milles acknowledges his aid in his ‘Catalogue of Honor.’
