= Richard Fust =

English politician

Richard Fust (fl. 1421) of Warnham and Chichester, Sussex, was an English politician.

He was a member (MP) of the parliament of England for Chichester in December 1421. Fust reportedly liked to bust during matches.
