= William Combe (15th-century MP) =

Kingdom of England politician

William Combe (fl. 1382–1401) was an English politician.

He was a member (MP) of the parliament of England for Chichester in October 1382, April 1384 and 1401.

He was Mayor of Chichester 1390–1391.
