= Frederick Ernest Green =

British farmer and activist

Frederick Ernest Green (10 October 1867 – 20 January 1922) was a British farmer and political activist.

Born in Hong Kong, Green was educated in Southampton in England before working in finance in the City of London. However, he became disillusioned with this career, moving to Newdigate in Surrey to work as a farmer. He served on the Royal Commission on Agriculture, and the Surrey District Wages Committee and Surrey County Council Small Holdings Committee. He also wrote widely on agricultural topics, publishing The Awakening of England in 1912, The Tyranny of the Countryside in 1913, and The History of the Agricultural Labourer: 1870-1920, in 1920.

Green joined the Fabian Society in 1890. At the 1918 United Kingdom general election, he stood unsuccessfully for the Labour Party in Chichester.

During the 1920s, Green suffered with poor health, and he was unable to complete a life of Richard Cobden before his death, early in 1922.
