= William Horlebat =

English politician

William Horlebat (died 1408), of Chichester, Sussex was an English politician.

He was a Member (MP) of the Parliament of England for Chichester in September 1388. He was Mayor of Chichester in 1398–9.
