= Andrew Tyrie =

British politician and life peer (born 1957)

The Right Honourable The Lord Tyrie PC
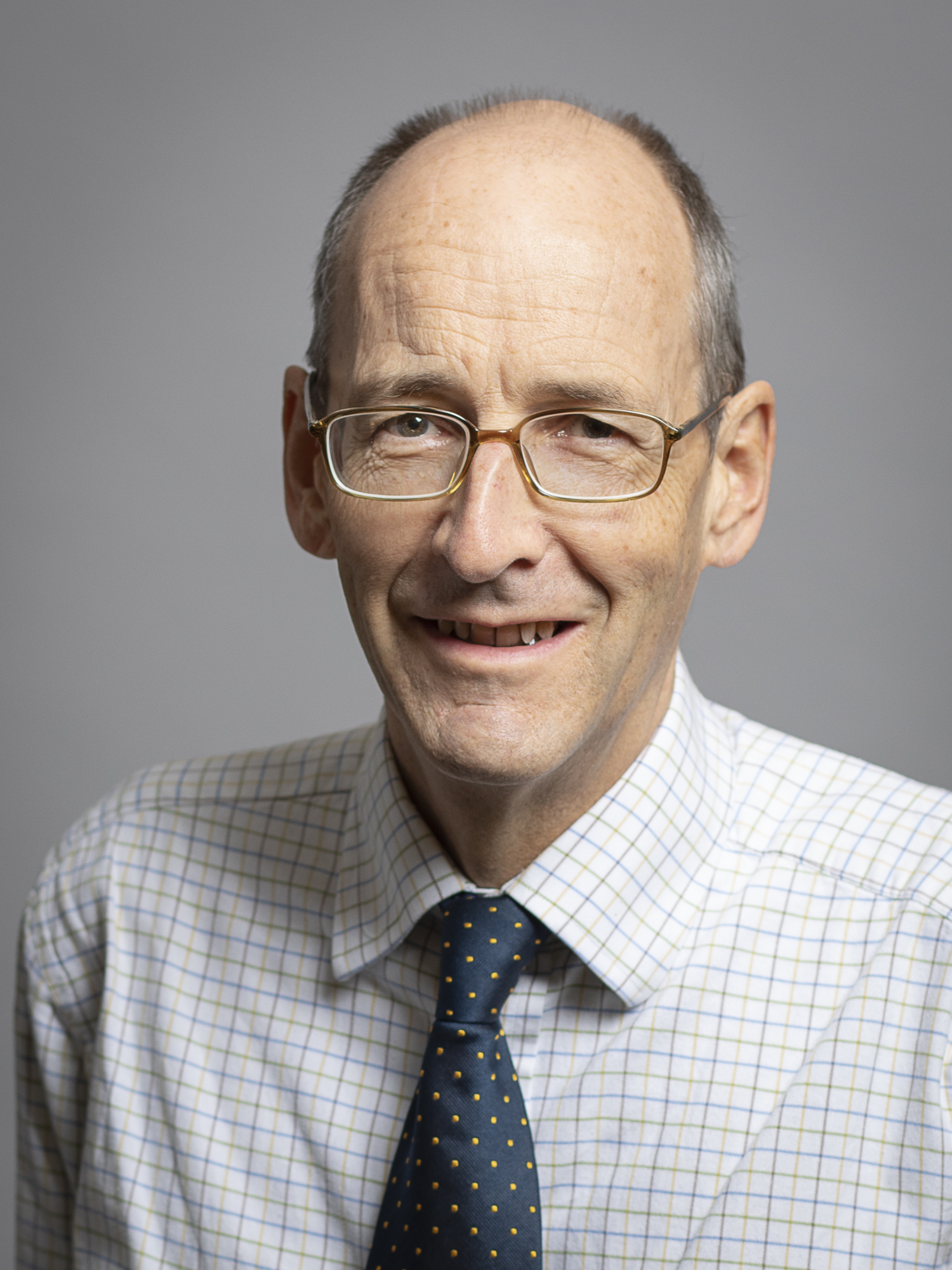
- Official portrait, 2020

Chair of the Competition and Markets Authority
- In office 20 June 2018 – 1 September 2020
- Prime Minister: Theresa May; Boris Johnson
- Preceded by: The Lord Currie
- Succeeded by: Jonathan Scott (acting)

Chair of the Liaison Committee
- In office 14 October 2015 – 3 May 2017
- Preceded by: Sir Alan Beith
- Succeeded by: Sarah Wollaston

Chair of the Treasury Select Committee
- In office 10 June 2010 – 3 May 2017
- Preceded by: John McFall
- Succeeded by: Nicky Morgan
Shadow portfolios
Shadow Paymaster General
In office 15 March 2004 – 6 May 2005
Leader	Michael Howard
Preceded by	Mark Prisk
Succeeded by	Mark Francois
Shadow Financial Secretary to the Treasury
In office 11 November 2003 – 15 March 2004
Leader	Michael Howard
Preceded by	Mark Prisk
Succeeded by	Mark Hoban
Parliamentary offices
Member of the House of Lords
Lord Temporal
Life peerage 12 June 2018
Member of Parliament for Chichester
In office 1 May 1997 – 3 May 2017
Preceded by	Anthony Nelson
Succeeded by	Gillian Keegan

Personal details
- Born: Andrew Guy Tyrie; 15 January 1957 (age 69) Rochford, Essex, England
- Party: Non-affiliated
- Other political affiliations: Conservative (before 2018)
- Education: Trinity College, Oxford; College of Europe; Wolfson College, Cambridge
- Profession: Economist
- Website: www.andrewtyrie.com

Andrew Guy Tyrie, Baron Tyrie, PC (born 15 January 1957) is a British politician, economist and former chair of the Competition and Markets Authority (2018–2020). A former member of the Conservative Party, he was the Member of Parliament (MP) for Chichester from 1997 to 2017. Tyrie was previously a special adviser at HM Treasury and chair of the Treasury Select Committee, having taken up the role on 10 June 2010.

He was described by Donald Macintyre of The Independent in 2013 as "the most powerful backbencher in the House of Commons", and by The Economist as a liberal conservative.

Tyrie retired from politics at the 2017 general election but was made a life peer in 2018. He sits in the House of Lords as a non-affiliated member.

== Early life ==
Tyrie was born at Rochford, Essex, on 15 January 1957. He was educated at Felsted School and Trinity College, Oxford, where he read PPE, graduating in 1979. He then attended the College of Europe in Bruges, where he received a postgraduate Certificate of Advanced European Studies, followed by Wolfson College, Cambridge, where he obtained the degree of MPhil.

Tyrie worked at the group head office of BP from 1981 to 1983. From 1990 to 1991, he was a Fellow of Nuffield College, Oxford, then a senior economist at the European Bank for Reconstruction and Development from 1992 to 1997. Tyrie contested Houghton and Washington in 1992.

== Parliamentary career ==
=== From 1997 to 2010 ===
Tyrie was first elected as the Member of Parliament for Chichester at the 1997 general election when Labour returned to government. Following the Conservative Party's second defeat to Labour at the 2001 general election, William Hague announced that he would stand down from the leadership role; Tyrie became Kenneth Clarke's campaign manager in the following leadership election. Clarke was successful in the final ballot of MPs, but was defeated by Iain Duncan Smith in the full membership vote. Tyrie refused to join the new leader's shadow cabinet due to ideological differences.

After Michael Howard succeeded Duncan Smith as Conservative leader, Tyrie served in his Shadow Cabinet as Shadow Financial Secretary to the Treasury between November 2003 and March 2004 and then as Shadow Paymaster General between March 2004 and May 2005.

In 2005, he became Founding Chairman of the All-Party Parliamentary Group on Extraordinary Rendition, a group of politicians in the British Parliament which examines the issue of extraordinary rendition and related issues. He was a member of the Public Accounts Commission from 1997 until 2017, which he chaired for a year, and served on the 1922 Committee Executive between 2005 and 2006.

The Conservatives' third consecutive defeat following the 2005 election led Michael Howard to announce his resignation as party leader, triggering a leadership contest. Tyrie managed Ken Clarke's campaign, but was again unsuccessful – Clarke was eliminated in the first ballot. David Cameron went on to be elected leader. Tyrie did not join the shadow cabinet.

Tyrie is also a Council Member of the Centre for Policy Studies. He is a shareholder of the Veritas Asian Fund and Falcon Land Limited, and he sat on the Board of Directors of Rugby Estates from 2002 to 2010. In his constituency, Tyrie has been involved locally, namely in supporting campaigns including the movement to prevent the Accident and Emergency Department at St Richard's Hospital from being downgraded.

=== Since 2010 ===
On 10 June 2010, Tyrie was elected to chair the Treasury Select Committee, defeating original favourite Michael Fallon to succeed John McFall. He was returned unopposed to the Treasury Select Committee chairmanship following the 2015 general election. Tyrie also represents the United Kingdom in the Inter-Parliamentary Union.

In 2012 he chaired the Parliamentary Commission on Banking Standards at the request of the Prime Minister and the Leader of the Opposition, a major investigation of both Lords and Commons into banking in response to the LIBOR scandal. Most of its recommendations were subsequently implemented.

The Financial Times speculated in 2012: "One possible reason why Mr Tyrie is still on the backbenches is that he irritated David Cameron by challenging his climate change policies. Mr Cameron did not ask him to become a Minister following the 2010 election and his nickname in senior Tory circles is 'Andrew Tiresome.'" Tyrie was one of only 5 MPs to vote against the Climate Change Act 2008, and denied the existence of the scientific consensus on climate change while the legislation was being debated.

Tyrie was Chair of the Liaison Committee from 2015 to 2017.

In December 2015, Tyrie rebelled against the Cameron government by opposing its motion to join the US-coalition in carrying out airstrikes against ISIS. In the following month, at a meeting of the Liaison Committee, which he chaired, Tyrie clashed with Cameron over the Prime Minister's refusal to release details regarding the UK's involvement in the Syrian civil war. At one point, Cameron exclaimed to Tyrie: "You don't know what you're talking about". Tyrie's questioning during the January 2016 session of the committee was described in The Guardian as a "one-man opposition". Tyrie, like Cameron, is a member of the Marylebone Cricket Club.

Tyrie was opposed to Brexit prior to the 2016 EU membership referendum.

Tyrie was created a life peer on 12 June 2018, taking the title Baron Tyrie, of Chichester in the County of West Sussex. He decided to sit in the House of Lords as a non-affiliated peer due to his role at the independent CMA.

=== Select committees ===
He has been a member of House of Commons select committees, including:

- 1997–2001 Joint Committee on Consolidation, &c., Bills
- 1997–2001 Public Administration Select Committee
- 2001–03 Treasury Select Committee
- 2001–04 Treasury Sub-Committee
- 2005–10 Constitutional Affairs Committee
- 2006 Joint Committee on Conventions
- 2009–10 Reform of the House of Commons Committee
- 2009–17 Joint Committee on Tax Law Rewrite Bills
- 2009–17 Treasury Select Committee
- 2010–17 Liaison Committee
- 2012–13 Parliamentary Commission on Banking Standards

== Post-parliamentary career ==
Tyrie stood down as a Member of Parliament in 2017, deciding not to stand as a candidate in the snap general election.

In April 2018, he was confirmed as the next Chair of the Competition and Markets Authority. In June 2020, Tyrie's departure from the role was announced, taking effect in September. It was reported that he had become frustrated by the limitations of the role. It was later speculated that Tyrie had been forced to stand down by CMA board members who had opposed his reformist agenda.

== Bibliography ==
- Subsidiarity: As History and Policy (with Andrew Adonis, 1990)
- Cautionary Tale of EMU: Some Mistakes, Some Remedies (1991)
- The Prospects For Public Spending (1996)
- Reforming the Lords: A Conservative Approach (1998)
- Leviathan at Large: The New Regulator for the Financial Markets (with Martin McElwee, 2000)
- Never Say Never: Common Sense on the Euro (2002)
- Mr Blair's Poodle: An Agenda for Reviving the House of Commons (CPS, 2003)
- Mr Blair's Poodle Goes to War: The House of Commons, Congress, Iraq (CPS, 2004)
- Pruning The Politicians: The case for a smaller House of Commons (2005)
- Greater Transparency for UK Retail Banking: A Proposal (2007)
- Account Rendered (with Roger Gough and Stuart McCracken, 2011)

Parliament of the United Kingdom
Preceded by Anthony Nelson	Member of Parliament for Chichester; 1997–2017	Succeeded by Gillian Keegan
Orders of precedence in the United Kingdom
Preceded by The Lord Houghton of Richmond	Gentlemen; Baron Tyrie	Followed by The Lord Pickles
