= Robert Jugler =

English politician

Robert Jugler (fl. 1402–1414), of Chichester, Sussex, was an English politician.

He was a member (MP) of the parliament of England for Chichester in 1402, 1407, May 1413 and November 1414.
