= William Morley (1606–1658) =

English politician

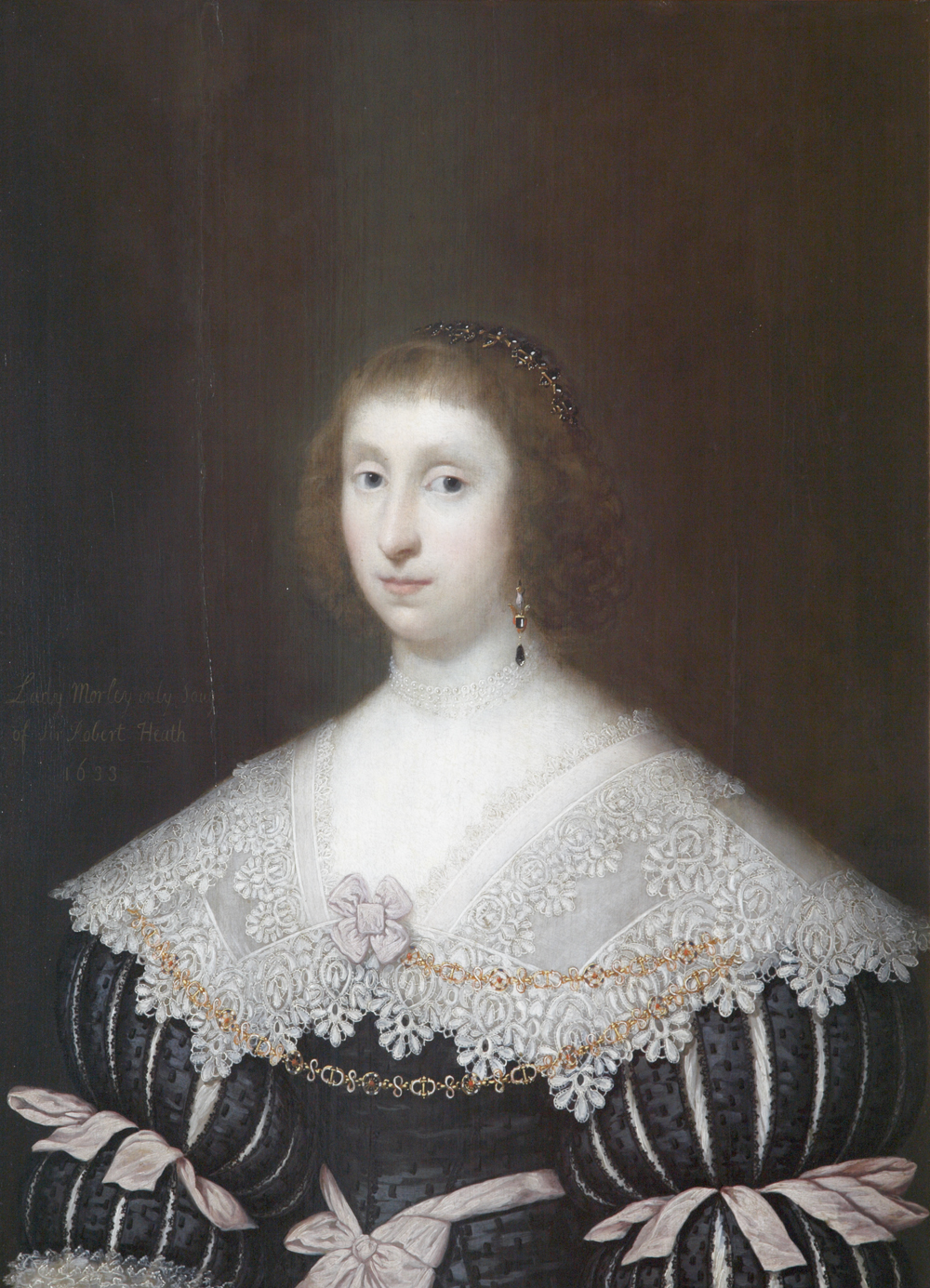
William Morley married Mary Heath (pictured)

Sir William Morley, JP (1606 – 1658) was an English politician who sat in the House of Commons at various times between 1626 and 1642. He supported the Royalist cause in the English Civil War.

Morley was the son of John Morley, MP and Cecily Caryll, daughter of Sir Edward Caryll, and was educated at Trinity College, Oxford. He was knighted at Titchfield on 4 September 1625, and the same year married Mary Heath, daughter of Sir Robert Heath, the attorney-general and an associate of his father, and his wife Margaret Miller. They had eight children, including William, the last male Morley of his line. He was returned to Parliament for Guildford in February 1626; Richard Shilton, who had originally been elected, had chosen to take another seat. Morley's father-in-law, an influential figure in the town, was presumably responsible for the nomination.

He did not return to Parliament at the end of his term, but remained a politically active figure, sitting as a commissioner on a number of bodies in Hampshire, Surrey and Sussex. He was appointed High Sheriff of Surrey and Sussex for 1636, and sat as a Justice of the Peace from 1632 to 1644.

Morley was elected for Chichester in the Long Parliament in November 1640, but was disabled from sitting in Parliament in November 1642 as a royalist. Throughout the remainder of the English Civil War he "preserved a cautious neutrality".

On his death in 1658, reportedly from cutting his throat, he was buried at Boxgrove. He was succeeded by his son William, whose daughter and heiress Mary married James Stanley, 10th Earl of Derby.

He is sometimes confused with an uncle of the same name, who studied at Christ Church, Oxford and was living in Chichester by 1605.

Parliament of England
Preceded by Robert More; Nicholas Stoughton	Member of Parliament for Guildford; 1626; With: Robert Parkhurst	Succeeded by Robert Parkhurst; Poynings More
Preceded by Christopher Lewknor; Edward Dowse	Member of Parliament for Chichester; 1640–1642; With: Christopher Lewknor	Succeeded by Sir John Temple; Henry Peck
