= Thomas Neel =

English politician

Thomas Neel (died 1410) of Chichester, Sussex, was an English politician.

He was a member (MP) of the parliament of England for Chichester in 1406 and 1407.
