= Robert Stryvelyne =

English politician

Robert Stryvelyne (fl. 1414–1421) of Chichester, Sussex, was an English politician.

He was a member (MP) of the parliament of England for Chichester in November 1414, 1417 and 1421.
