= Thomas Whatman =

English politician

Thomas Whatman (Feb. 1576–1630), of Chichester, Sussex, was an English politician.

He was a Member (MP) of the Parliament of England for Chichester in 1621 and 1624 and for Portsmouth in 1626.

Parliament of England
Preceded by Sir John Morley; Adrian Stoughton	Member of Parliament for Chichester; 1621–1625; With: Sir Edward Cecil 1621–1624; Sir Thomas Edmondes 1624–1625	Succeeded by Algernon, Lord Percy; Humphrey Haggett
Preceded by Sir Benjamin Rudyerd; Sir Daniel Norton	Member of Parliament for Portsmouth; 1626; With: Sir James Fullerton	Succeeded by Owen Jennens; William Towerson
