= Thomas Haynes =

Thomas Haynes may refer to:

- Thomas J. Haynes, general in the Rhode Island Air National Guard
- Thomas Haynes (burgess), member of the Virginia House of Burgesses
- Thomas Haynes, captain of HMS Lowestoffe

== See also ==
- Tom Haines (born 1998), English cricketer
- Tommy Haynes (born 1952), American Olympic athlete
- Thomas Hayne (disambiguation)
