= Robert Trigges =

16th-century English politician

Robert Trigges (by 1508 – 1550/1551), of St. Peter's, Chichester, Sussex and Chawton, Hampshire, was an English politician.

Trigges was a member of parliament for Chichester in 1529.
