= 1905 Chichester by-election =

Parliamentary by-election in 1905

- 2 June 1905
Candidate	Talbot	Allen
Party	Conservative	Liberal
Popular vote	4,174	3,762
Percentage	52.6%	47.4%
MP before election
Lord Edmund Talbot
Conservative
Subsequent MP
Lord Edmund Talbot
Conservative

The 1905 Chichester by-election was a Parliamentary by-election. It returned one Member of Parliament (MP) to the House of Commons of the United Kingdom, elected by the first past the post voting system. It was held on 2 June 1905 after the incumbent Conservative MP Lord Edmund Talbot was appointed as Lord Commissioner of the Treasury and he was obliged to stand again in a ministerial by-election. It was retained by Talbot.

== Vacancy ==
Lord Edmund Talbot had been Conservative MP for the seat of Chichester since the 1894 Chichester by-election. He was appointed as Lord Commissioner of the Treasury and he was obliged to stand again in a ministerial by-election.

== Electoral history ==
The seat had been Conservative since creation in 1868. Lord Edmund Talbot held the seat at the last election, unopposed:

General election 1900: Chichester
Party	Candidate	Votes	%	±%
Conservative	Edmund Talbot	Unopposed	N/A	N/A
Conservative hold				

Talbot had always been returned unopposed. The last contest in the constituency came in 1892, when the Conservative out-polled the Liberal by nearly two to one.

== Candidates ==
The local Conservative Association re-selected 50 year-old Lord Edmund Talbot as their candidate to defend the seat. The local Liberal Association selected 33 year-old John Ernest Allen as their candidate to challenge for the seat. Allen was a Barrister-at-law, who had been educated at both Oxford and Cambridge Universities where he gained a Master of Arts.

== Campaign ==
Polling Day was fixed for the 2 June 1905, the day after the 1905 Whitby by-election. On the eve of poll, the Liberals gained Whitby from the Conservatives.

== Result ==
The Conservatives held the seat with their lowest majority since 1885:

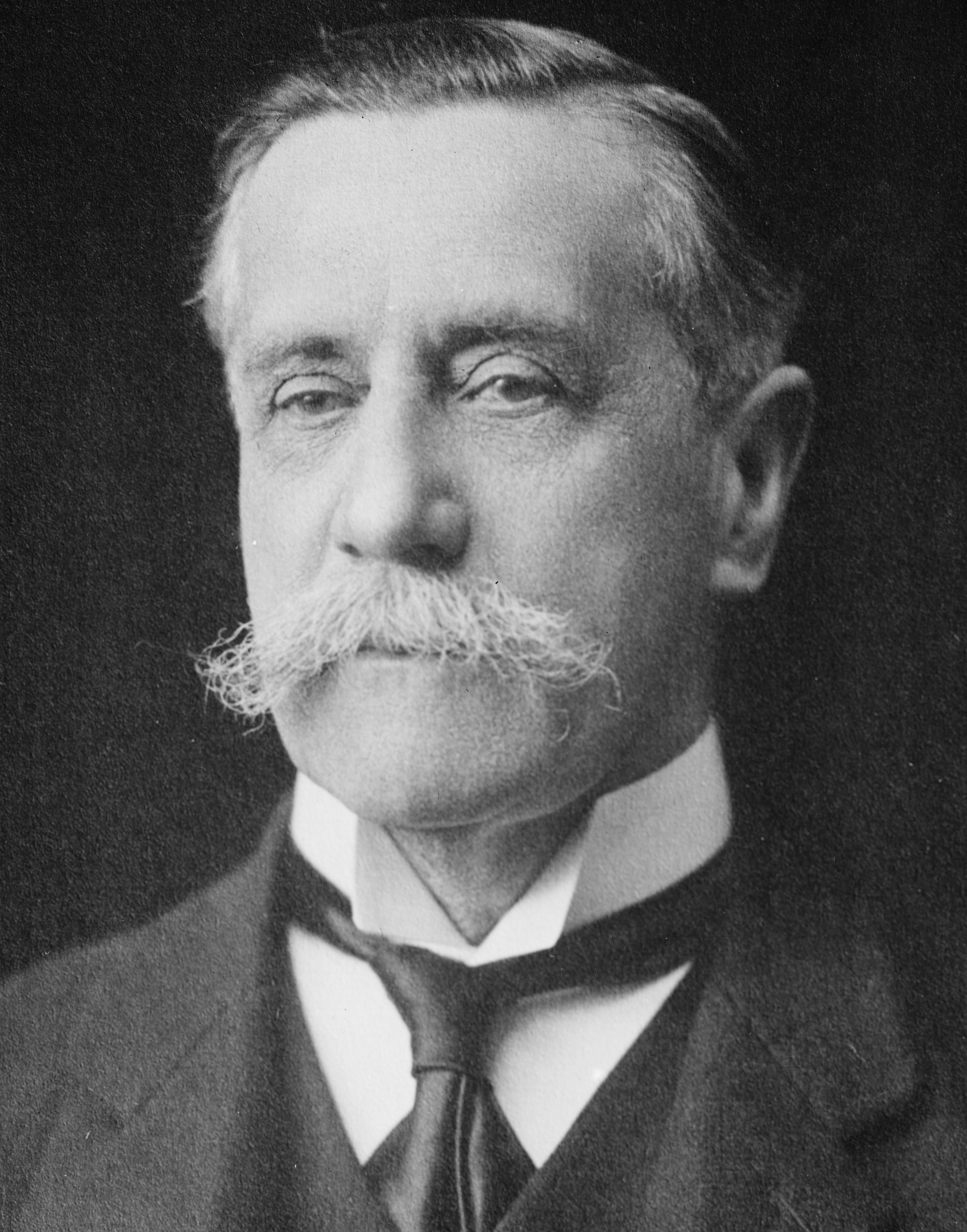
Talbot

Chichester by-election, 1905
Party	Candidate	Votes	%	±%
Conservative	Edmund Talbot	4,174	52.6	N/A
Liberal	John Ernest Allen	3,762	47.4	New
Majority		412	5.2	N/A
Turnout		7,936	73.6	N/A
Conservative hold		Swing	N/A	

== Aftermath ==
At the following general election, Talbot again held the seat, the result was:

General election 1906: Chichester
Party	Candidate	Votes	%	±%
Conservative	Lord Talbot	5,197	56.4	N/A
Liberal	John Ernest Allen	4,023	43.6	N/A
Majority		1,174	12.8	N/A
Turnout		9,220	82.1	N/A
Conservative hold		Swing	N/A	
