= Simon Vincent =

English politician (fll 1384–1402)

Simon Vincent (fl. 1384–1402), of Tarring Neville and West Dean, Sussex, was an English politician.

== Family ==
His son was the MP, John Vincent.

== Career ==
He was a member (MP) of the parliament of England for Chichester in November 1384, September 1388 and 1402.
