= Richard Sherter =

English politician

Richard Sherter (fl. 1419) of Sussex was an English politician.

He was a member (MP) of the parliament of England for Chichester in 1419.
