= John Dolyte =

English politician

John Dolyte or Tolite (fl. 1406–1433) of Chichester, Sussex, was an English politician.

He was a member (MP) of the parliament of England for Chichester in 1406, 1419, December 1421 and 1433.
