= John Sherare =

Member of the Parliament of England

John Sherare (fl. 1378–1395) of Chichester, Sussex, was an English politician

He was a Member (MP) of the Parliament of England for Chichester in October 1377, January 1380, 1381, May 1382, October 1382, October 1383, November 1384, 1385, 1386, January 1390, 1391, 1393 and 1395 and for Lewes in 1378.
