= John Goldston =

English politician

John Goldston (fl. 1397), of Chichester, Sussex, was an English politician.

He was a member (MP) of the parliament of England for Chichester in January 1397.
