= John atte Mille =

English politician

John atte Mille (fl. 1380–1395) of Chichester, Sussex, was an English politician.

He was a member (MP) of the parliament of England for Chichester in November 1380 and 1395.
