= John Okehurst =

English politician

John Okehurst (fl. 1397) was an English politician.

He was a member (MP) of the parliament of England for Chichester in September 1397.
