= William Neel =

English politician

William Neel (died 1418), of Chichester, Sussex and London, was an English politician.

He was a member (MP) of the parliament of England for Chichester in February 1388, 1399 and 1415. He was Mayor of Chichester Michaelmas in 1393–95 and 1401–02.
