= Peter Tolpat =

16th-century English politician

Peter Tolpat (by 1526 – 1563/1564), of Chichester, Sussex, was an English politician.

== Career ==
He was a member of parliament (MP) for Chichester in 1558.
