= Valentine Dale =

Member of the Parliament of England

Valentine Dale (died 1589) was an English jurist and diplomat. He served as Judge of the High Court of Admiralty from 1584 to 1589.

== Life ==
He supplicated the university of Oxford in 1541 for the degree of B.A., but does not appear to have been admitted. He was, however, elected a fellow of All Souls' College in 1542 . In November 1545 he proceeded to the degree of bachelor of the civil law; and in 1550 he wrote from All Souls' College to Sir William Cecil, desiring his interest to procure for him the situation of official of the archdeaconry of York. Subsequently, he travelled in France, and at Orleans was created a doctor of civil law. Having more than once supplicated the university of Oxford for that degree, it is supposed that he was incorporated there in November 1552. On 14 January 1554 he was admitted a member of the College of Advocates at Doctors' Commons. He was a member of the House of Commons for Taunton in the parliaments of 21 October 1555, 20 January 1558, and 1559; later he was four times MP for Chichester (1572, 1584, 1586 and 1589). On 9 July 1562 he was incorporated LL.D. in the university of Cambridge.

In 1563 he was ambassador in Flanders, receiving his final despatch from the regent on 6 February. He was again sent to Flanders, in December 1563, to answer the complaints against England for lack of justice and for depredations. In the parliament of 8 May 1572 he sat for the city of Chichester, being at or about that time one of the masters of requests. On 15 February 1573 he was presented to the archdeaconry of Surrey. On 19 March 1573 he was appointed resident ambassador in France, where he continued till 1576. In the meanwhile (18 January 1574) he became dean of Wells. Between 1576 and 1580 he served on several important royal commissions and was Master of Requests (1576–1589). To the parliament which assembled on 23 November 1584 he was returned both for the city of Chichester and the borough of Hindon, Wiltshire, and elected to serve for Chichester.

On 30 January 1585 the queen issued a commission to Dale and Sir Julius Cæsar to exercise admiralty jurisdiction during the vacancy of the office of lord high admiral. On 20 February 1585 Dale was in the special commission of oyer and terminer for Middlesex, under which Dr. William Parry was arraigned and convicted of high treason. On 22 March following he was presented to the mastership of Sherburn Hospital, County Durham. His name occurs in the special commission for Middlesex (5 September 1586), under which Anthony Babington and others were indicted for treason. He assisted at the trial of Mary, Queen of Scots, at Fotheringhay, in October the same year; and to the parliament which met on the 15th of that month he was again returned for Chichester. He acted as one of the high commissioners for causes ecclesiastical at the deprivation of Robert Cawdrey on 30 May 1587.

In February 1588 Dale, Henry Stanley, 4th Earl of Derby, William Brooke, 10th Baron Cobham, Sir James Croft, and John Rogers, were sent as ambassadors to Alexander Farnese, Duke of Parma to treat for a league between England and Spain. The negotiations were broken off on account of the fitting out of the Spanish Armada for the invasion of England. To the parliament of 4 February 1589 Dale was once more returned for Chichester. He was present as a commissioner at the trial, on 18 April 1580, of Philip Howard, Earl of Arundel, for high treason. It has been stated that he went on an embassy to Portugal. He died on 17 November 1589, at his house near St. Paul's Cathedral, London, and was buried at St Gregory by St Paul's. It appears that he also had a residence in Hampshire, and that he was a justice of the peace for that county. His daughter Dorothy was the wife of Sir John North, knight, eldest son of Roger North, 2nd Baron North.

== Sources ==
- This article incorporates text from a publication now in the public domain: "Dale, Valentine". Dictionary of National Biography. London: Smith, Elder & Co. 1885–1900.
