= Geoffrey Hebbe =

English politician

Geoffrey Hebbe (fl. 1413–1423) of Chichester, Sussex, was an English politician.

He was a member (MP) of the parliament of England for Chichester in May 1413 and 1423.
