= Apothecary to the Household at Windsor =

Position in British Royal Household

Apothecary to the Household at Windsor is an officer of the Medical Household of the Royal Household of the Sovereign of the United Kingdom. They have a salaried daily surgery. The current Apothecary to the Household at Windsor is Kirstin Ostle, the first female post holder.

== List of apothecaries ==
- William Fairbank 1901 (jointly)
- William A. Ellison 1901 (jointly)
- Sir Henry Linnington Martyn (1888–1947) 1919–1938
- E. Claud Malden 1938–1952
- Richard W. L. May 1952–1965
- J. P. Clayton 1965–1986
- John H. D. Briscoe 1986–1997
- Jonathan Holliday 1997–2019
- Kirstin Ostle 2019–
