= Thomas May (MP for Chichester) =

English politician (c.1645–1718)

Thomas May (c. 1645 – 1718), of Rawmere, Lavant, Sussex, was an English politician.

He was a member (MP) of the parliament of England for Chichester in 1689, 1690 and 1691.
