= William Elson (died 1705) =

English politician

William Elson (1673–1705), of Oving, near Chichester, Sussex, was an English politician.

He was a member (MP) of the parliament of England for Chichester in 1695–1698 and February 1701 – October 1705.
