= Walter Roynon =

16th-century English politician

Walter Roynon (by 1529 – 1564 or later), of Chichester, Sussex, was an English politician.

Roynon was a member of parliament for Chichester in November 1554.
