= Chichester (constituency) =

Parliamentary constituency in the United Kingdom, 1295 onwards

Coordinates: 50.83652°N 0.77918°W

- County constituency for the House of Commons
- Interactive map of boundaries from 2024
- Boundary of Chichester in South East England
- County: West Sussex
- Population: 104,374 (2011 census)
- Electorate: 76,765 (2023)
- Major settlements: Chichester, Bersted, Pagham, Selsey, Nutbourne

Current constituency
- Created: 1295
- Member of Parliament: Jess Brown-Fuller (Liberal Democrats)
- Seats: 1295–1868: Two; 1868–: One

Chichester is a constituency (Note: A county constituency (for the purposes of election expenses and type of returning officer)) in West Sussex, represented in the House of Commons of the UK Parliament since 2024 by Jess Brown-Fuller, a Liberal Democrat.

== History ==
Chichester centres on the small medieval cathedral city by the South Downs National Park. It is one of the oldest constituencies in the UK, having been created when commoners were first called to the Model Parliament in 1295 as one of the original Parliamentary boroughs returning two members. The seat has sent one member since 1868, after the Reform Act 1867.

In its various forms, Chichester was a Conservative stronghold from 1868 to 2024 (except for a brief period of 10 months in 1923-24 when it was held by the Liberal Party's Charles Rudkin), but at the 2024 general election, it was won decisively by the Liberal Democrats on a huge swing of 31% with the election of Jess Brown-Fuller.

== Boundaries ==
Map of boundaries 2010–2024

The seat forms a far western strip of West Sussex and covers the southern half of the Chichester district (including the City of Chichester and the coastal area).

Before the 1974 redistribution Chichester was a more compact seat, taking in the eastern towns of Arundel and Bognor Regis in latter years. Emergence of newer urban centres meant that the area was expanded to the north to avoid malapportionment.

1885–1918: The Municipal Borough of Chichester, the Sessional Divisions of Arundel and Chichester, and part of the Sessional Division of Steyning.

1918–1950: The Municipal Boroughs of Arundel and Chichester, the Urban Districts of Bognor and Littlehampton, and the Rural Districts of East Preston, Midhurst, Petworth, Westbourne, and Westhampnett.

1950–1974: The Municipal Borough of Chichester, the Urban District of Bognor Regis, and the Rural District of Chichester.

1974–1983: The Municipal Borough of Chichester, the Rural Districts of Midhurst and Petworth, and part of the Rural District of Chichester.

1983–1997: The District of Chichester. The constituency boundaries remained unchanged.

1997–2010: All the wards of the District of Chichester except the Bury, Plaistow and Wisborough Green wards.

2010–2024: The District of Chichester wards of Bosham, Boxgrove, Chichester East, Chichester North, Chichester South, Chichester West, Donnington, Easebourne, East Wittering, Fernhurst, Fishbourne, Funtington, Harting, Lavant, Midhurst, North Mundham, Plaistow, Rogate, Selsey North, Selsey South, Sidlesham, Southbourne, Stedham, Tangmere, West Wittering, and Westbourne.

2024–present: The District of Arun wards of Bersted and Pagham, and District of Chichester wards of Chichester Central, Chichester East, Chichester North, Chichester South, Chichester West, Goodwood (part), Harbour Villages, Lavant, North Mundham & Tangmere, Selsey South, Sidlesham with Selsey North, Southbourne, The Witterings, and Westbourne.

Electorate reduced to bring it within the permitted range by transferring northern, largely rural areas, including the town of Midhurst, to Arundel and South Downs. To partly compensate, Bersted and Pagham were transferred in from Bognor Regis and Littlehampton.

== Constituency profile ==
=== Physical geography ===
The constituency runs from the county's border with Surrey, through a partly wooded broad swathe of the South Downs, to the town of Selsey and paired villages The Witterings on the English Channel. The small cathedral city Chichester and Selsey account for 6 of 24 wards but comprise a higher proportion of councillors as these are larger three-member wards. The highest density of villages is near the Hampshire border, in the west.

=== Social geography ===
The city has relatively little social housing and few homes which are cheap to buy or rent, as epitomised in the National Park status of much of the land north of Chichester. In Chichester itself the percentage of social housing in 2011 was 20.5%, including 3% directly in local authority homes. The area is linked to London by train and the A3. Modestly deprived areas of Chichester, Selsey and the rural South Downs are dominated by the working poor and poorer pensioners with little generational unemployment. The local economy has many entry-level or intensive manual jobs in food production, retail, driving, warehousing as well as intermittent or traditionally low paid labour such as road repair and the care sector. Some of these workers commute from the outskirts of nearest major cities Brighton and Portsmouth. The contributory districts occupy the top two rankings out of all seven in terms of fuel poverty in West Sussex.

=== Results ===
The seat was held by the Conservatives from 1924 to 2024 continuously; in 2017 the new Conservative candidate Gillian Keegan polled over 60% of the vote, a share which dropped slightly in 2019. The 2024 election saw the seat gained by the Liberal Democrat Jess Brown-Fuller who polled over 49%. The closest election before then was the 1997 general election, where a Liberal Democrat took 29.0% of the vote. The best performances by Labour candidates were in 2001 and 2017, with 21.4% and 22.4% of the vote, respectively. In terms of the fourth party since 2001, the three general elections to 2010 saw an increase in support for the UK Independence Party to their highest level to date, 6.8%.

== Members of Parliament ==
=== MPs 1295–1660 ===
- Constituency created 1295

| Parliament | First member | Second member |
|---|---|---|
| 1386 | Thomas Patching | John Sherare |
| 1388 (Feb) | Thomas Patching | William Neel |
| 1388 (Sep) | William Horlebat | Simon Vincent |
| 1390 (Jan) | Thomas Patching | John Sherare |
| 1390 (Nov) | | |
| 1391 | Thomas Patching | John Sherare |
| 1393 | Thomas Patching | John Sherare |
| 1394 | | |
| 1395 | John atte Mille | John Sherare |
| 1397 (Jan) | John Goldston | John Hebbe |
| 1397 (Sep) | Thomas Patching | John Okehurst |
| 1399 | Thomas Patching | William Neel |
| 1401 | William Combe | Thomas Hayne |
| 1402 | Robert Jugler | Simon Vincent |
| 1404 (Jan) | | |
| 1404 (Oct) | | |
| 1406 | John Dolyte | Thomas Neel |
| 1407 | Robert Jugler | Thomas Neel |
| 1410 | | |
| 1411 | | |
| 1413 (Feb) | | |
| 1413 (May) | Geoffrey Hebbe | Robert Jugler |
| 1414 (Apr) | | |
| 1414 (Nov) | Robert Stryvelyne | Robert Jugler |
| 1415 | William Farnhurst | Thomas Neel |
| 1416 (Mar) | William Farnhurst | John Vincent |
| 1416 (Oct) | | |
| 1417 | Thomas Russell | Robert Stryvelyne |
| 1419 | John Dolyte | Richard Sherter |
| 1420 | John Cok | William Hore |
| 1421 (May) | William Farnhurst | Robert Stryvelyne |
| 1421 (Dec) | John Dolyte | Richard Fust |
| 1431 | William Hore | |
| 1510–1523 | No names known | |
| 1529 | Robert Bowyer I | Robert Trigges |
| 1536 | ? | |
| 1539 | ? | |
| 1542 | William Erneley | ? |
| 1545 | ? | |
| 1547 | Richard Sackville | Robert Bowyer I |
| 1553 (Mar) | Thomas Stoughton | Thomas Carpenter |
| 1553 (Oct) | Thomas Stoughton | Thomas Carpenter |
| 1554 (Apr) | Thomas Stoughton | Thomas Carpenter |
| 1554 (Nov) | John Digons | Walter Roynon |
| 1555 | Richard Knight | Robert Bowyer II |
| 1558 | Peter Tolpat | Lawrence Ardren |
| 1558–9 | Sir Henry Radcliffe | Robert Bowyer II |
| 1562–3 | Thomas Stoughton | John Sherwin |
| 1571 | Thomas Kyrle | Thomas West |
| 1572 | Valentine Dale | Richard Lewknor |
| 1584 | Valentine Dale | Richard Lewknor |
| 1586 | Valentine Dale | Richard Lewknor |
| 1588 | Valentine Dale | Richard Lewknor |
| 1593 | Richard Lewknor | William Ashby |
| 1597 | Richard Lewknor | Adrian Stoughton |
| 1601 | Adrian Stoughton | Stephen Barnham |
| 1604 | Adrian Stoughton | Sir John Morley |
| 1614 | Adrian Stoughton | Sir John Morley |
| 1621 | Sir Edward Cecil | Thomas Whatman |
| 1624 | Thomas Edmondes | Thomas Whatman |
| 1625 | Algernon Percy | Humphrey Haggett |
| 1626 | Algernon Percy | Humphrey Haggett |
| April 1626 | Edward Dowse | Humphrey Haggett |
| 1628 | William Cawley | Henry Bellingham |
| 1629–1640 | No Parliaments summoned | |
| 1640 (Apr) | Christopher Lewknor | Edward Dowse |
| 1640 (Nov) | Christopher Lewknor | Sir William Morley, disabled 23 November 1642 |
| 1645 | Sir John Temple | Henry Peck |
| 1648 | ? | |
| 1653 | Chichester not represented in Barebones Parliament | |
| 1654 | Henry Peckham | (one seat only) |
| 1656 | Henry Peckham | (one seat only) |
| 1659 | Henry Peckham | William Cawley |

=== MPs 1660–1868 ===
| Year | First member | First party | Second member | Second party |
|---|---|---|---|---|
| 1660 | Henry Peckham | | John Farrington | |
| 1661 | Henry Peckham | | William Garway | |
| 1673 | Richard May | | William Garway | |
| February 1679 | Richard May | | John Braman | |
| September 1679 | John Farrington | | John Braman | |
| 1681 | Richard Farington | Whig | John Braman | |
| 1685 | Sir Richard May | | George Gounter | |
| 1689 | Thomas Miller | | Thomas May | |
| 1695 | The Earl of Ranelagh | | William Elson | |
| 1698 | Sir Richard Farington, 1st Bt | Whig | John Miller | Tory |
| January 1701 | Sir Thomas May | | William Elson | |
| November 1701 | John Miller | Tory | William Elson | |
| May 1705 | Sir Thomas Littleton, 3rd Bt | Whig | William Elson | |
| November 1705 | Sir Thomas Littleton, 3rd Bt | Whig | Thomas Onslow | |
| 1708 | Thomas Carr | Tory | Sir Richard Farington, 1st Bt | Whig |
| 1710 | Sir John Miller, 2nd Bt | Tory | Sir Richard Farington, 1st Bt | Whig |
| 1713 | William Elson | | James Brudenell | |
| 1715 | Sir Richard Farington, 1st Bt | Whig | Thomas Miller | |
| 1719 | Henry Kelsall | | Thomas Miller | |
| 1722 | Charles Lennox | | Thomas Miller | |
| 1724 | Lord William Beauclerk | | Thomas Miller | |
| 1727 | Lord William Beauclerk | | Charles Lumley | |
| 1729 | Lord William Beauclerk | | James Lumley | |
| 1733 | Sir Thomas Prendergast, 2nd Baronet | | James Lumley | |
| 1734 | James Brudenell | | Thomas Yates | |
| 1741 | James Brudenell | | John Page | |
| 1746 | George Keppel | | John Page | |
| 1755 | Augustus Keppel | Whig | John Page | |
| 1761 | Lord George Lennox | | John Page | |
| 1767 | William Keppel | | John Page | |
| 1768 | William Keppel | | Thomas Conolly | |
| 1780 | William Keppel | | Thomas Steele | Tory |
| 1782 | Percy Charles Wyndham | | Thomas Steele | Tory |
| 1784 | George White-Thomas | Whig | Thomas Steele | Tory |
| 1807 | George White-Thomas | Whig | James du Pre | Tory |
| 1812 | Charles Gordon-Lennox | Tory | William Huskisson | Tory |
| 1819 | Lord John Lennox | Whig | William Huskisson | Tory |
| 1823 | Lord John Lennox | Whig | William Stephen Poyntz | Whig |
| 1830 | Lord John Lennox | Whig | John Smith | Whig |
| 1831 | Lord Arthur Lennox | Whig | John Abel Smith | Whig |
| 1837 | Lord Arthur Lennox | Conservative | John Abel Smith | Whig |
| 1846 | Lord Henry Lennox | Conservative | John Abel Smith | Whig |
| 1859 | Lord Henry Lennox | Conservative | Humphrey William Freeland | Liberal |
| 1863 | Lord Henry Lennox | Conservative | John Abel Smith | Liberal |
| 1868 | Representation reduced to one member | | | |

=== MPs since 1868 ===
| Election | Member | Party |
|---|---|---|
| 1868 | Lord Henry Lennox | Conservative |
| 1885 | Charles Gordon-Lennox | Conservative |
| 1888 by-election | Lord Walter Gordon-Lennox | Conservative |
| 1894 by-election | Lord Edmund Talbot | Conservative |
| 1918 | Lord Edmund Talbot | Coalition Conservative |
| 1921 by-election | Sir William Bird | Coalition Conservative |
| 1922 | Sir William Bird | Conservative |
| 1923 | Charles Rudkin | Liberal |
| 1924 | John Courtauld | Conservative |
| 1942 by-election | Sir Lancelot Joynson-Hicks | Conservative |
| 1958 by-election | Bill Loveys | Conservative |
| 1969 by-election | Christopher Chataway | Conservative |
| Oct 1974 | Anthony Nelson | Conservative |
| 1997 | Andrew Tyrie | Conservative |
| 2017 | Gillian Keegan | Conservative |
| 2024 | Jess Brown-Fuller | Liberal Democrats |

== Elections ==
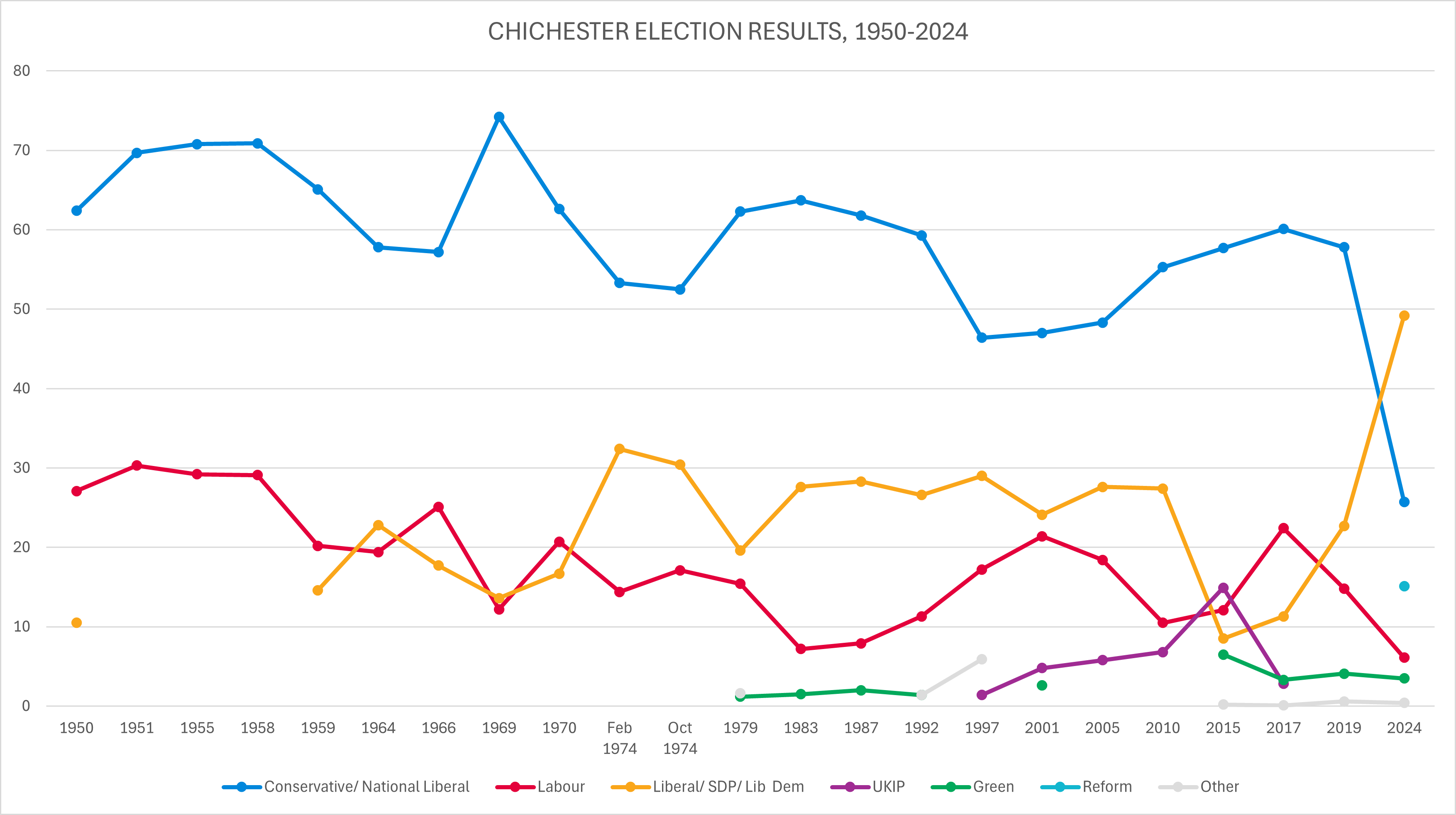
Election results 1950-2024

=== Elections in the 2020s ===
General election 2024: Chichester
| Party | Candidate | Votes | % | ±% |
|---|---|---|---|---|
| Liberal Democrats | Jess Brown-Fuller | 25,540 | 49.2 | +28.9 |
| Conservative | Gillian Keegan | 13,368 | 25.7 | −33.1 |
| Reform | Teresa De Santis | 7,859 | 15.1 | N/A |
| Labour | Tom Collinge | 3,175 | 6.1 | −9.3 |
| Green | Tim Young | 1,815 | 3.5 | −1.4 |
| Independent | Andrew Emerson | 190 | 0.4 | +0.2 |
| Majority | | 12,172 | 23.5 | N/A |
| Turnout | | 51,947 | 66.3 | −0.2 |
| Registered electors | | 78,374 | | |
| Liberal Democrats gain from Conservative | | Swing | +31.0 | |

=== Elections in the 2010s ===
2019 notional result
| Party | Vote | % |
|---|---|---|
| Conservative | 29,981 | 58.8 |
| Liberal Democrats | 10,359 | 20.3 |
| Labour | 7,850 | 15.4 |
| Green | 2,499 | 4.9 |
| Others | 333 | 0.6 |
| Turnout | 51,022 | 66.5 |
| Electorate | 76,765 | |

General election 2019: Chichester
| Party | Candidate | Votes | % | ±% |
|---|---|---|---|---|
| Conservative | Gillian Keegan | 35,402 | 57.8 | −2.3 |
| Liberal Democrats | Kate O'Kelly | 13,912 | 22.7 | +11.4 |
| Labour | Jay Morton | 9,069 | 14.8 | −7.6 |
| Green | Heather Barrie | 2,527 | 4.1 | +0.8 |
| Libertarian | Adam Brown | 224 | 0.4 | N/A |
| Patria | Andrew Emerson | 109 | 0.2 | +0.1 |
| Majority | | 21,490 | 35.1 | −2.6 |
| Turnout | | 61,243 | 71.6 | +1.0 |
| Conservative hold | | Swing | −6.9 | |

General election 2017: Chichester
| Party | Candidate | Votes | % | ±% |
|---|---|---|---|---|
| Conservative | Gillian Keegan | 36,032 | 60.1 | +2.4 |
| Labour | Mark Farwell | 13,411 | 22.4 | +10.3 |
| Liberal Democrats | Jonathan Brown | 6,749 | 11.3 | +2.8 |
| Green | Heather Barrie | 1,992 | 3.3 | −3.2 |
| UKIP | Andrew Moncreiff | 1,650 | 2.8 | −12.1 |
| Patria | Andrew Emerson | 84 | 0.1 | −0.1 |
| Majority | | 22,621 | 37.7 | −5.1 |
| Turnout | | 59,918 | 70.6 | +2.2 |
| Conservative hold | | Swing | −3.8 | |

General election 2015: Chichester
| Party | Candidate | Votes | % | ±% |
|---|---|---|---|---|
| Conservative | Andrew Tyrie | 32,953 | 57.7 | +2.4 |
| UKIP | Andrew Moncreiff | 8,540 | 14.9 | +8.1 |
| Labour | Mark Farwell | 6,933 | 12.1 | +1.6 |
| Liberal Democrats | Andrew Smith | 4,865 | 8.5 | −18.9 |
| Green | Jasper Richmond | 3,742 | 6.5 | N/A |
| Patria | Andrew Emerson | 106 | 0.2 | N/A |
| Majority | | 24,413 | 42.8 | +14.9 |
| Turnout | | 57,139 | 68.4 | −1.3 |
| Conservative hold | | Swing | −2.9 | |

General election 2010: Chichester
| Party | Candidate | Votes | % | ±% |
|---|---|---|---|---|
| Conservative | Andrew Tyrie | 31,427 | 55.3 | +7.4 |
| Liberal Democrats | Martin Lury | 15,550 | 27.4 | −0.3 |
| Labour | Simon Holland | 5,937 | 10.5 | −8.1 |
| UKIP | Andrew Moncreiff | 3,873 | 6.8 | +1.0 |
| Majority | | 15,877 | 27.9 | +7.7 |
| Turnout | | 56,787 | 69.7 | +4.5 |
| Conservative hold | | Swing | +3.8 | |

=== Elections in the 2000s ===
General election 2005: Chichester
| Party | Candidate | Votes | % | ±% |
|---|---|---|---|---|
| Conservative | Andrew Tyrie | 25,302 | 48.3 | +1.3 |
| Liberal Democrats | Alan Hilliar | 14,442 | 27.6 | +3.5 |
| Labour | Jonathan Austin | 9,632 | 18.4 | −3.0 |
| UKIP | Douglas Denny | 3,025 | 5.8 | +1.0 |
| Majority | | 10,860 | 20.7 | −2.2 |
| Turnout | | 52,401 | 66.6 | +2.8 |
| Conservative hold | | Swing | −1.1 | |

General election 2001: Chichester
| Party | Candidate | Votes | % | ±% |
|---|---|---|---|---|
| Conservative | Andrew Tyrie | 23,320 | 47.0 | +0.6 |
| Liberal Democrats | Lynne Ravenscroft | 11,965 | 24.1 | −4.9 |
| Labour | Celia Barlow | 10,627 | 21.4 | +4.2 |
| UKIP | Douglas Denny | 2,380 | 4.8 | +3.4 |
| Green | Gavin Graham | 1,292 | 2.6 | N/A |
| Majority | | 11,355 | 22.9 | +5.5 |
| Turnout | | 49,584 | 63.8 | −10.8 |
| Conservative hold | | Swing | +2.7 | |

=== Elections in the 1990s ===
General election 1997: Chichester
| Party | Candidate | Votes | % | ±% |
|---|---|---|---|---|
| Conservative | Andrew Tyrie | 25,895 | 46.4 | −12.9 |
| Liberal Democrats | Peter Gardiner | 16,161 | 29.0 | +2.4 |
| Labour | Charlie Smith | 9,605 | 17.2 | +5.9 |
| Referendum | Douglas Denny | 3,318 | 5.9 | N/A |
| UKIP | J.G. Rix | 800 | 1.4 | N/A |
| Majority | | 9,734 | 17.4 | −15.2 |
| Turnout | | 55,779 | 74.6 | −3.2 |
| Conservative hold | | Swing | | |

This constituency underwent boundary changes between the 1992 and 1997 general elections and thus change in share of vote is based on a notional calculation.

General election 1992: Chichester
| Party | Candidate | Votes | % | ±% |
|---|---|---|---|---|
| Conservative | Anthony Nelson | 37,906 | 59.3 | −2.5 |
| Liberal Democrats | Peter Gardiner | 17,019 | 26.6 | −1.7 |
| Labour | Diane Andrewes | 7,192 | 11.3 | +3.4 |
| Green | Eric Paine | 876 | 1.4 | −0.6 |
| Liberal | JL Weights | 643 | 1.0 | N/A |
| Natural Law | JL Jackson | 238 | 0.4 | N/A |
| Majority | | 20,887 | 32.7 | −0.8 |
| Turnout | | 63,874 | 77.8 | +3.4 |
| Conservative hold | | Swing | −0.4 | |

=== Elections in the 1980s ===
General election 1987: Chichester
| Party | Candidate | Votes | % | ±% |
|---|---|---|---|---|
| Conservative | Anthony Nelson | 37,274 | 61.8 | −1.9 |
| Alliance (Liberal) | Peter Weston | 17,097 | 28.3 | +0.7 |
| Labour | David Morrison | 4,751 | 7.9 | +0.7 |
| Green | Ian Bagnall | 1,196 | 2.0 | +0.5 |
| Majority | | 20,177 | 33.5 | −2.6 |
| Turnout | | 60,318 | 74.4 | +2.3 |
| Conservative hold | | Swing | −1.3 | |

General election 1983: Chichester
| Party | Candidate | Votes | % | ±% |
|---|---|---|---|---|
| Conservative | Anthony Nelson | 35,482 | 63.7 | +1.4 |
| Alliance (SDP) | Howard Gibson | 15,365 | 27.6 | +8.0 |
| Labour | Robert Rhodes | 3,995 | 7.2 | −8.2 |
| Ecology | Jonathan Sherlock | 838 | 1.5 | N/A |
| Majority | | 20,117 | 36.1 | −6.6 |
| Turnout | | 55,680 | 72.1 | −4.5 |
| Conservative hold | | Swing | | |

=== Elections in the 1970s ===
General election 1979: Chichester
| Party | Candidate | Votes | % | ±% |
|---|---|---|---|---|
| Conservative | Anthony Nelson | 34,696 | 62.29 | |
| Liberal | J Rix | 10,920 | 19.60 | |
| Labour | GN Cooke | 8,569 | 15.38 | |
| United Country Party | E Iremonger | 863 | 1.55 | N/A |
| Ecology | N Bagnall | 656 | 1.18 | N/A |
| Majority | | 23,776 | 42.69 | |
| Turnout | | 55,704 | 75.56 | |
| Conservative hold | | Swing | | |

General election October 1974: Chichester
| Party | Candidate | Votes | % | ±% |
|---|---|---|---|---|
| Conservative | Anthony Nelson | 26,942 | 52.51 | |
| Liberal | GA Jeffs | 15,601 | 30.41 | |
| Labour | Nigel Smith | 8,767 | 17.09 | |
| Majority | | 11,341 | 22.10 | |
| Turnout | | 51,310 | 73.54 | |
| Conservative hold | | Swing | | |

General election February 1974: Chichester
| Party | Candidate | Votes | % | ±% |
|---|---|---|---|---|
| Conservative | Christopher Chataway | 29,127 | 53.25 | |
| Liberal | G Jeffs | 17,714 | 32.39 | |
| Labour | Nigel Smith | 7,854 | 14.36 | |
| Majority | | 11,413 | 20.86 | |
| Turnout | | 54,695 | 79.12 | |
| Conservative hold | | Swing | | |

General election 1970: Chichester
| Party | Candidate | Votes | % | ±% |
|---|---|---|---|---|
| Conservative | Christopher Chataway | 38,120 | 62.60 | |
| Labour | Neville Sandelson | 12,574 | 20.65 | |
| Liberal | Denys Gilbert Kinsella | 10,205 | 16.76 | |
| Majority | | 25,546 | 41.95 | |
| Turnout | | 60,899 | 69.91 | |
| Conservative hold | | Swing | +5.0 | |

=== Elections in the 1960s ===
1969 Chichester by-election
| Party | Candidate | Votes | % | ±% |
|---|---|---|---|---|
| Conservative | Christopher Chataway | 31,966 | 74.16 | +17.00 |
| Liberal | Denys Gilbert Kinsella | 5,879 | 13.64 | −4.07 |
| Labour | John White | 5,257 | 12.20 | −12.93 |
| Majority | | 26,087 | 60.52 | +28.49 |
| Turnout | | 43,102 | | |
| Conservative hold | | Swing | | |

General election 1966: Chichester
| Party | Candidate | Votes | % | ±% |
|---|---|---|---|---|
| Conservative | Walter Loveys | 31,358 | 57.16 | |
| Labour | David J Burnett | 13,784 | 25.13 | |
| Liberal | Patrick J Collins | 9,714 | 17.71 | |
| Majority | | 17,574 | 32.03 | |
| Turnout | | 54,856 | 73.19 | |
| Conservative hold | | Swing | +3.15 | |

General election 1964: Chichester
| Party | Candidate | Votes | % | ±% |
|---|---|---|---|---|
| Conservative | Walter Loveys | 30,225 | 57.80 | |
| Liberal | Denys Gilbert Kinsella | 11,912 | 22.78 | |
| Labour | Adrian J Cohen | 10,155 | 19.42 | |
| Majority | | 18,313 | 35.02 | |
| Turnout | | 52,292 | 74.03 | |
| Conservative hold | | Swing | | |

=== Elections in the 1950s ===
General election 1959: Chichester
| Party | Candidate | Votes | % | ±% |
|---|---|---|---|---|
| Conservative | Walter Loveys | 30,755 | 65.14 | |
| Labour | John S Spooner | 9,546 | 20.22 | |
| Liberal | Jackson Newman | 6,913 | 14.64 | N/A |
| Majority | | 21,209 | 44.92 | |
| Turnout | | 47,214 | 73.82 | |
| Conservative hold | | Swing | | |

1958 Chichester by-election
| Party | Candidate | Votes | % | ±% |
|---|---|---|---|---|
| Conservative | Walter Loveys | 23,158 | 70.90 | +0.11 |
| Labour | William Edgar Simpkins | 9,504 | 29.10 | −0.11 |
| Majority | | 13,654 | 41.80 | +0.23 |
| Turnout | | 32,662 | | |
| Conservative hold | | Swing | | |

General election 1955: Chichester
| Party | Candidate | Votes | % | ±% |
|---|---|---|---|---|
| Conservative | Lancelot Joynson-Hicks | 30,857 | 70.79 | |
| Labour | Mervyn Jones | 12,735 | 29.21 | |
| Majority | | 18,122 | 41.58 | |
| Turnout | | 43,592 | 71.80 | |
| Conservative hold | | Swing | | |

General election 1951: Chichester
| Party | Candidate | Votes | % | ±% |
|---|---|---|---|---|
| Conservative | Lancelot Joynson-Hicks | 32,166 | 69.72 | |
| Labour | David George Packham | 13,971 | 30.28 | |
| Majority | | 18,195 | 39.44 | |
| Turnout | | 46,137 | 77.32 | |
| Conservative hold | | Swing | | |

General election 1950: Chichester
| Party | Candidate | Votes | % | ±% |
|---|---|---|---|---|
| Conservative | Lancelot Joynson-Hicks | 29,106 | 62.42 | |
| Labour | David George Packham | 12,614 | 27.05 | |
| Liberal | Ronald Vincent Gibson | 4,911 | 10.53 | |
| Majority | | 16,492 | 35.37 | |
| Turnout | | 46,631 | 80.47 | |
| Conservative hold | | Swing | | |

=== Elections in the 1940s ===
General election 1945: Chichester
| Party | Candidate | Votes | % | ±% |
|---|---|---|---|---|
| Conservative | Lancelot Joynson-Hicks | 30,989 | 54.6 | −23.7 |
| Labour | Rosalie Francesca Chamberlayne | 13,670 | 24.1 | +2.4 |
| Liberal | Gerald Kidd | 11,345 | 20.0 | N/A |
| National Independent | MH Woodard | 625 | 1.1 | N/A |
| Democratic | Paul Tracy Carter | 118 | 0.2 | N/A |
| Majority | | 17,319 | 30.5 | −26.1 |
| Turnout | | 56,747 | 68.24 | +8.7 |
| Conservative hold | | Swing | | |

1942 Chichester by-election
| Party | Candidate | Votes | % | ±% |
|---|---|---|---|---|
| Conservative | Lancelot Joynson-Hicks | 15,634 | 58.1 | −20.2 |
| Independent Progressive | Gerald Kidd | 10,564 | 39.3 | N/A |
| Independent | A. A. W. Tribe | 706 | 2.6 | N/A |
| Majority | | 5,070 | 18.8 | −37.8 |
| Turnout | | 26,904 | 29.2 | −30.3 |
| Conservative hold | | Swing | | |

General Election 1939–40:

Another general election was required to take place before the end of 1940. The political parties had been making preparations for an election to take place from 1939 and by the end of this year, the following candidates had been selected;

- Conservative: John Courtauld
- Labour: E A Weston
- Liberal: Gerald Kidd
- British Union: Charles Hudson

=== Elections in the 1930s ===
General election 1935: Chichester
| Party | Candidate | Votes | % | ±% |
|---|---|---|---|---|
| Conservative | John Courtauld | 37,882 | 78.32 | |
| Labour | Claude William Higgins | 10,484 | 21.67 | |
| Majority | | 27,398 | 56.65 | |
| Turnout | | 48,366 | 59.5 | −9.0 |
| Conservative hold | | Swing | | |

General election 1931: Chichester
| Party | Candidate | Votes | % | ±% |
|---|---|---|---|---|
| Conservative | John Courtauld | 43,756 | 87.79 | |
| Labour | Claude William Higgins | 6,085 | 12.21 | |
| Majority | | 37,671 | 75.58 | |
| Turnout | | 49,841 | 68.51 | |
| Conservative hold | | Swing | | |

=== Elections in the 1920s ===
General election 1929: Chichester
| Party | Candidate | Votes | % | ±% |
|---|---|---|---|---|
| Unionist | John Courtauld | 26,278 | 60.2 | +0.9 |
| Liberal | John Freeman Dunn | 17,398 | 39.8 | +4.2 |
| Majority | | 8,880 | 20.4 | −3.3 |
| Turnout | | 43,676 | 64.9 | −7.5 |
| Registered electors | | 67,276 | | |
| Unionist hold | | Swing | −1.7 | |

General election 1924: Chichester
| Party | Candidate | Votes | % | ±% |
|---|---|---|---|---|
| Unionist | John Courtauld | 20,710 | 59.3 | +11.4 |
| Liberal | Charles Rudkin | 12,416 | 35.6 | −16.5 |
| Labour | Richard Henry Kennard Hope | 1,765 | 5.1 | N/A |
| Majority | | 8,294 | 23.7 | N/A |
| Turnout | | 34,891 | 72.4 | +12.2 |
| Registered electors | | 48,170 | | |
| Unionist gain from Liberal | | Swing | +14.0 | |

General election 1923: Chichester
| Party | Candidate | Votes | % | ±% |
|---|---|---|---|---|
| Liberal | Charles Rudkin | 14,513 | 52.1 | N/A |
| Unionist | William Bird | 13,348 | 47.9 | −26.4 |
| Majority | | 1,165 | 4.2 | N/A |
| Turnout | | 27,861 | 60.2 | +2.3 |
| Registered electors | | 46,257 | | |
| Liberal gain from Unionist | | Swing | | |

General election 1922: Chichester
| Party | Candidate | Votes | % | ±% |
|---|---|---|---|---|
| Unionist | William Bird | 19,494 | 74.3 | +5.9 |
| Labour | Richard Henry Kennard Hope | 6,752 | 25.7 | −5.9 |
| Majority | | 12,742 | 48.6 | +11.8 |
| Turnout | | 26,246 | 57.9 | +7.6 |
| Registered electors | | 45,364 | | |
| Unionist hold | | Swing | +5.9 | |

1921 Chichester by-election
| Party | Candidate | Votes | % | ±% |
|---|---|---|---|---|
| Coalition Unionist | William Bird | Unopposed | | |
| Unionist hold | | | | |

=== Elections in the 1910s ===
General election 1918: Chichester
| Party | | Candidate | Votes | % | ±% |
|---|---|---|---|---|---|
| C | Unionist | Edmund Talbot | 14,491 | 68.4 | +2.0 |
| | Labour | Frederick Ernest Green | 6,705 | 31.6 | N/A |
| Majority | | | 7,786 | 36.8 | +4.0 |
| Turnout | | | 21,196 | 50.3 | −22.8 |
| Registered electors | | | 42,131 | | |
| | Unionist hold | | Swing | | |
C indicates candidate endorsed by the coalition government.

General Election 1914–15:

Another General Election was required to take place before the end of 1915. The political parties had been making preparations for an election to take place and by July 1914, the following candidates had been selected;

- Unionist: Edmund Talbot
- Liberal:

General election December 1910: Chichester
| Party | Candidate | Votes | % | ±% |
|---|---|---|---|---|
| Conservative | Edmund Talbot | 5,900 | 66.4 | ±0.0 |
| Liberal | Richard Reiss | 2,985 | 33.6 | ±0.0 |
| Majority | | 2,915 | 32.8 | ±0.0 |
| Turnout | | 8,885 | 73.1 | −8.6 |
| Conservative hold | | Swing | ±0.0 | |

General election January 1910: Chichester
| Party | Candidate | Votes | % | ±% |
|---|---|---|---|---|
| Conservative | Edmund Talbot | 6,589 | 66.4 | +10.0 |
| Liberal | Richard Reiss | 3,338 | 33.6 | −10.0 |
| Majority | | 3,251 | 32.8 | +20.0 |
| Turnout | | 9,927 | 81.7 | −0.4 |
| Conservative hold | | Swing | +10.0 | |

=== Elections in the 1900s ===
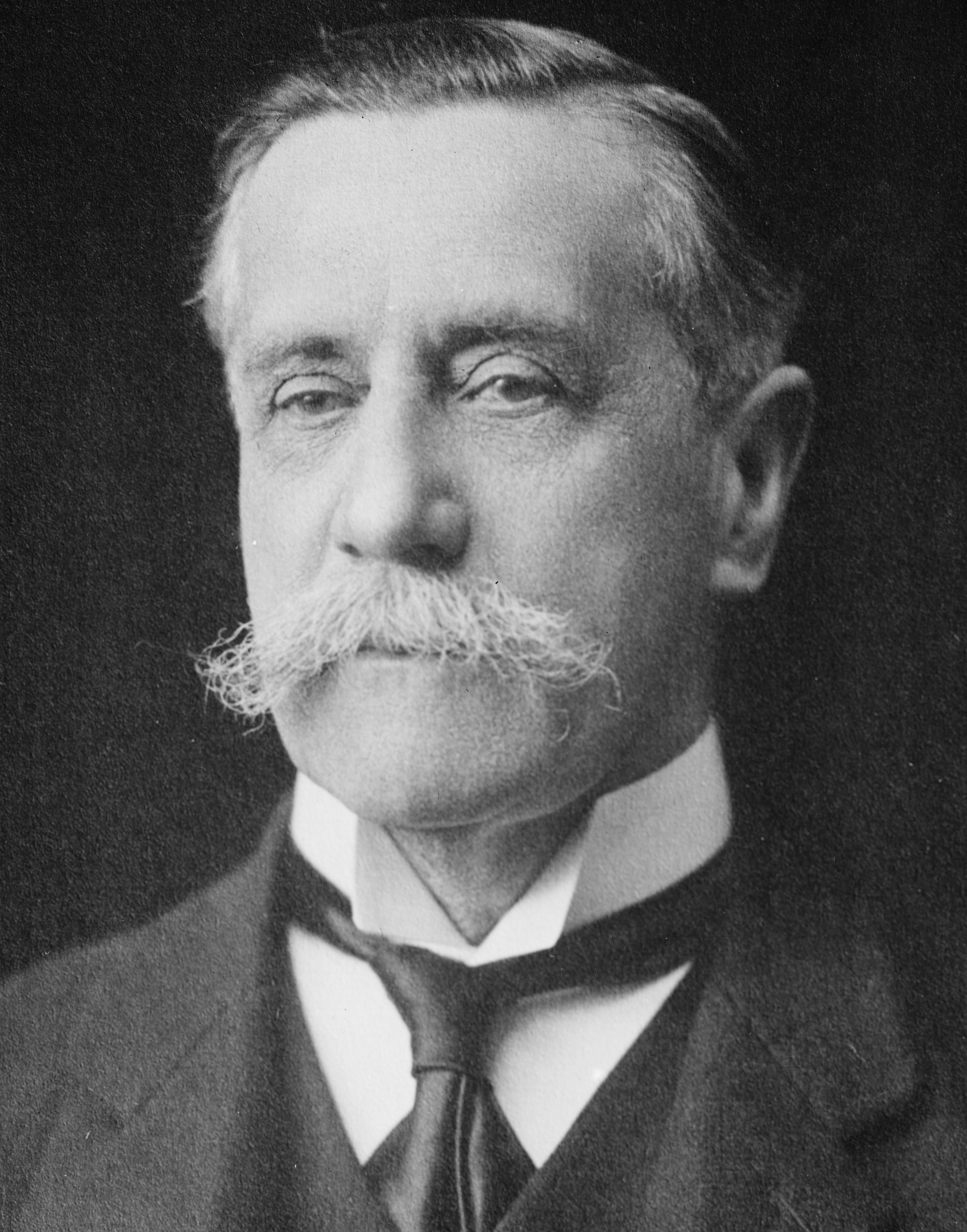
Talbot

General election 1906: Chichester
| Party | Candidate | Votes | % | ±% |
|---|---|---|---|---|
| Conservative | Edmund Talbot | 5,197 | 56.4 | N/A |
| Liberal | John Ernest Allen | 4,023 | 43.6 | N/A |
| Majority | | 1,174 | 12.8 | N/A |
| Turnout | | 9,220 | 82.1 | N/A |
| Registered electors | | 11,225 | | |
| Conservative hold | | Swing | N/A | |

1905 Chichester by-election
| Party | Candidate | Votes | % | ±% |
|---|---|---|---|---|
| Conservative | Edmund Talbot | 4,174 | 52.6 | N/A |
| Liberal | John Ernest Allen | 3,762 | 47.4 | N/A |
| Majority | | 412 | 5.2 | N/A |
| Turnout | | 7,936 | 73.6 | N/A |
| Registered electors | | 10,784 | | |
| Conservative hold | | Swing | N/A | |

General election 1900: Chichester
| Party | Candidate | Votes | % | ±% |
|---|---|---|---|---|
| Conservative | Edmund Talbot | Unopposed | | |
| Conservative hold | | | | |

=== Elections in the 1890s ===
General election 1895: Chichester
| Party | Candidate | Votes | % | ±% |
|---|---|---|---|---|
| Conservative | Edmund Talbot | Unopposed | | |
| Conservative hold | | | | |

1894 Chichester by-election
| Party | Candidate | Votes | % | ±% |
|---|---|---|---|---|
| Conservative | Edmund Talbot | Unopposed | | |
| Conservative hold | | | | |

General election 1892: Chichester
| Party | Candidate | Votes | % | ±% |
|---|---|---|---|---|
| Conservative | Walter Gordon-Lennox | 4,236 | 64.2 | N/A |
| Liberal | Herbert J. Reid | 2,361 | 35.8 | N/A |
| Majority | | 1,875 | 28.4 | N/A |
| Turnout | | 6,597 | 72.1 | N/A |
| Registered electors | | 9,146 | | |
| Conservative hold | | Swing | N/A | |

1891 Chichester by-election
| Party | Candidate | Votes | % | ±% |
|---|---|---|---|---|
| Conservative | Walter Gordon-Lennox | Unopposed | | |
| Conservative hold | | | | |

=== Elections in the 1880s ===
1888 Chichester by-election
| Party | Candidate | Votes | % | ±% |
|---|---|---|---|---|
| Conservative | Walter Gordon-Lennox | Unopposed | | |
| Conservative hold | | | | |

- Caused by Gordon-Lennox's resignation.

General election 1886: Chichester
| Party | Candidate | Votes | % | ±% |
|---|---|---|---|---|
| Conservative | Charles Gordon-Lennox | Unopposed | | |
| Conservative hold | | | | |

General election 1885: Chichester
| Party | Candidate | Votes | % | ±% |
|---|---|---|---|---|
| Conservative | Charles Gordon-Lennox | 4,760 | 65.8 | +9.5 |
| Liberal | Frederick Waymouth Gibbs | 2,470 | 34.2 | −9.5 |
| Majority | | 2,290 | 31.6 | +19.0 |
| Turnout | | 7,230 | 85.0 | +1.4 |
| Registered electors | | 8,502 | | |
| Conservative hold | | Swing | +9.5 | |

General election 1880: Chichester
| Party | Candidate | Votes | % | ±% |
|---|---|---|---|---|
| Conservative | Henry Gordon-Lennox | 602 | 56.3 | N/A |
| Liberal | Frederick Waymouth Gibbs | 467 | 43.7 | N/A |
| Majority | | 135 | 12.6 | N/A |
| Turnout | | 1,069 | 83.6 | N/A |
| Registered electors | | 1,279 | | |
| Conservative hold | | Swing | N/A | |

=== Elections in the 1870s ===
1874 Chichester by-election
| Party | Candidate | Votes | % | ±% |
|---|---|---|---|---|
| Conservative | Henry Gordon-Lennox | Unopposed | | |
| Registered electors | | 1,240 | | |
| Conservative hold | | | | |

- Caused by Lennox's appointment as First Commissioner of Works and Public Buildings

General election 1874: Chichester
| Party | Candidate | Votes | % | ±% |
|---|---|---|---|---|
| Conservative | Henry Gordon-Lennox | Unopposed | | |
| Registered electors | | 1,240 | | |
| Conservative hold | | | | |

=== Elections in the 1860s ===
General election 1868: Chichester
| Party | Candidate | Votes | % | ±% |
|---|---|---|---|---|
| Conservative | Henry Gordon-Lennox | 603 | 58.2 | N/A |
| Liberal | John Abel Smith | 433 | 41.8 | N/A |
| Majority | | 170 | 16.4 | N/A |
| Turnout | | 1,036 | 86.7 | N/A |
| Registered electors | | 1,195 | | |
| Conservative hold | | | | |

Seat reduced to one member

General election 1865: Chichester
| Party | Candidate | Votes | % | ±% |
|---|---|---|---|---|
| Conservative | Henry Gordon-Lennox | Unopposed | | |
| Liberal | John Abel Smith | Unopposed | | |
| Registered electors | | 562 | | |
| Conservative hold | | | | |
| Liberal hold | | | | |

1863 Chichester by-election
| Party | Candidate | Votes | % | ±% |
|---|---|---|---|---|
| Liberal | John Abel Smith | Unopposed | | |
| Liberal hold | | | | |

- Caused by Freeland's resignation.

=== Elections in the 1850s ===
General election 1859: Chichester
| Party | Candidate | Votes | % | ±% |
|---|---|---|---|---|
| Liberal | Humphrey William Freeland | 300 | 34.5 | N/A |
| Conservative | Henry Gordon-Lennox | 288 | 33.1 | N/A |
| Liberal | John Abel Smith | 282 | 32.4 | N/A |
| Turnout | | 579 (est) | 92.8 (est) | N/A |
| Registered electors | | 562 | | |
| Majority | | 12 | 1.4 | N/A |
| Liberal hold | | | | |
| Majority | | 6 | 0.7 | N/A |
| Conservative hold | | | | |

1858 Chichester by-election
| Party | Candidate | Votes | % | ±% |
|---|---|---|---|---|
| Conservative | Henry Gordon-Lennox | Unopposed | | |
| Conservative hold | | | | |

- Caused by Gordon-Lennox's appointment as a Lord Commissioner of the Treasury.

General election 1857: Chichester
| Party | Candidate | Votes | % | ±% |
|---|---|---|---|---|
| Conservative | Henry Gordon-Lennox | Unopposed | | |
| Whig | John Abel Smith | Unopposed | | |
| Registered electors | | 638 | | |
| Conservative hold | | | | |
| Whig hold | | | | |

General election 1852: Chichester
| Party | Candidate | Votes | % | ±% |
|---|---|---|---|---|
| Conservative | Henry Gordon-Lennox | Unopposed | | |
| Whig | John Abel Smith | Unopposed | | |
| Registered electors | | 757 | | |
| Conservative hold | | | | |
| Whig hold | | | | |

1852 Chichester by-election
| Party | Candidate | Votes | % | ±% |
|---|---|---|---|---|
| Conservative | Henry Gordon-Lennox | Unopposed | | |
| Conservative hold | | | | |

- Caused by Gordon-Lennox's appointment as a Lord Commissioner of the Treasury.

=== Elections in the 1840s ===
General election 1847: Chichester
| Party | Candidate | Votes | % | ±% |
|---|---|---|---|---|
| Conservative | Henry Gordon-Lennox | Unopposed | | |
| Whig | John Abel Smith | Unopposed | | |
| Registered electors | | 799 | | |
| Conservative hold | | | | |
| Whig hold | | | | |

1846 Chichester by-election
| Party | Candidate | Votes | % | ±% |
|---|---|---|---|---|
| Conservative | Henry Gordon-Lennox | Unopposed | | |
| Conservative hold | | | | |

- Caused by Lennox's resignation by accepting the office of Steward of the Manor of Hempholme

1845 Chichester by-election
| Party | Candidate | Votes | % | ±% |
|---|---|---|---|---|
| Conservative | Arthur Lennox | Unopposed | | |
| Conservative hold | | | | |

- Caused by Lennox's appointment as Clerk of the Ordnance

1844 Chichester by-election
| Party | Candidate | Votes | % | ±% |
|---|---|---|---|---|
| Conservative | Arthur Lennox | Unopposed | | |
| Conservative hold | | | | |

- Caused by Lennox's appointment as a Lord Commissioner of the Treasury

General election 1841: Chichester
| Party | Candidate | Votes | % | ±% |
|---|---|---|---|---|
| Conservative | Arthur Lennox | Unopposed | | |
| Whig | John Abel Smith | Unopposed | | |
| Registered electors | | 829 | | |
| Conservative hold | | | | |
| Whig hold | | | | |

=== Elections in the 1830s ===
General election 1837: Chichester
| Party | Candidate | Votes | % | ±% |
|---|---|---|---|---|
| Whig | John Abel Smith | 490 | 43.4 | +2.4 |
| Conservative | Arthur Lennox | 387 | 34.3 | −13.0 |
| Radical | John Morgan Cobbett | 252 | 22.3 | +10.5 |
| Turnout | | 631 | 71.3 | c. +17.6 |
| Registered electors | | 885 | | |
| Majority | | 103 | 9.1 | −20.1 |
| Whig hold | | Swing | +7.7 | |
| Majority | | 135 | 12.0 | N/A |
| Conservative gain from Whig | | Swing | −7.7 | |

General election 1835: Chichester
| Party | Candidate | Votes | % | ±% |
|---|---|---|---|---|
| Whig | Arthur Lennox | 486 | 47.3 | −2.3 |
| Whig | John Abel Smith | 421 | 41.0 | +9.0 |
| Radical | John Morgan Cobbett | 121 | 11.8 | −6.6 |
| Majority | | 300 | 29.2 | +15.6 |
| Turnout | | c. 514 | c. 53.7 | c. −36.8 |
| Registered electors | | 958 | | |
| Whig hold | | Swing | +0.5 | |
| Whig hold | | Swing | +6.2 | |

General election 1832: Chichester
| Party | Candidate | Votes | % | ±% |
|---|---|---|---|---|
| Whig | Arthur Lennox | 707 | 49.6 | +0.7 |
| Whig | John Abel Smith | 456 | 32.0 | +3.4 |
| Radical | William Parrott Carter | 263 | 18.4 | −4.1 |
| Majority | | 193 | 13.6 | +7.5 |
| Turnout | | 771 | 90.5 | c. −0.6 |
| Registered electors | | 852 | | |
| Whig hold | | Swing | +1.4 | |
| Whig hold | | Swing | +2.7 | |

General election 1831: Chichester
| Party | Candidate | Votes | % | ±% |
|---|---|---|---|---|
| Whig | Arthur Lennox | 665 | 48.9 | +2.6 |
| Whig | John Abel Smith | 388 | 28.6 | −9.3 |
| Radical | Godfrey Webster | 306 | 22.5 | +6.7 |
| Majority | | 82 | 6.1 | −16.0 |
| Turnout | | 716 | c. 91.1 | +35.8 |
| Registered electors | | c. 786 | | |
| Whig hold | | Swing | −0.4 | |
| Whig hold | | Swing | −6.3 | |

General election 1830: Chichester
| Party | Candidate | Votes | % | ±% |
|---|---|---|---|---|
| Whig | John Lennox | 643 | 46.3 | |
| Whig | John Smith | 527 | 37.9 | |
| Radical | Charles Sinclair Cullen | 219 | 15.8 | |
| Majority | | 308 | 22.1 | |
| Turnout | | 768 | 55.3 | |
| Registered electors | | | | |
| Whig hold | | Swing | | |
| Whig hold | | Swing | | |

== See also ==
- List of parliamentary constituencies in West Sussex
- List of parliamentary constituencies in the South East England (region)

== Notes ==
Elections

== Sources ==
- Election result, 2010 (BBC)
- Election result, 2005 (BBC)
- Election results, 1997 – 2001 (BBC)
- Election results, 1997 – 2001 (Election Demon)
- Election results, 1983 – 1992 (Election Demon)
- Election results, 1992 – 2010 (Guardian) (UKIP result for 2001 is incorrect)
- Iain Dale, ed. (2003). The Times House of Commons 1929, 1931, 1935. Politico's (reprint). ISBN 1-84275-033-X.
- The Times House of Commons 1945. The Times. 1945.
- The Times House of Commons 1950. The Times. 1950.
- The Times House of Commons 1955. The Times. 1955.
