= William Hore (Chichester MP) =

William Hore (died 1448), of Chichester, Sussex, was an English Member of Parliament for Chichester in 1420 and 1421. He was Mayor of Chichester 1421–2, 11 January 1423 – Michaelmas 1424, Michaelmas 1426–7, May 1432–3, 1436 – 29 June 1438, 28 April 1440–1 and Michalemas 1447.
