= List of Keepers of the Records in the Tower of London =

This is a list of Keepers of the Records in the Tower of London. The position was medieval in origin, and ended in 1838 with the creation of the London Public Record Office.

In the 16th century the distinction was made between Chancery Rolls from the reign of Richard III onwards, which were under the direct control of the Master of the Rolls, and earlier Rolls that were kept in the Tower of London, with a designated Keeper. The Masters of the Rolls wished to keep at least a theoretical control over the Keepers, but until 1604 and a judgement against Sir Roger Wilbraham there was no case law to support the claim.

== Keepers ==
- Under Elizabeth I: Sir Henry Stafford.
- 1567: William Bowyer.
- 1576: Michael Heneage and Thomas Heneage jointly.
- 1601: William Lambarde, with Peter Proby.
- 1604–1612: Robert Bowyer and Henry Elsynge jointly.
- 1623: John Borough.
- 1643: John Selden, parliamentary appointee. The royalist choice was the Lancaster Herald, William Ryley. Parliament took on Ryley, who had come to London, in 1644, who served as clerk of the records.
- 1651: The Long Parliament decided that the Master of the Rolls should take over the post, with a clerk to look into the records. Ryley, who had been assistant to Selden, retained the post.
- 1660–1669: William Prynne.
- 1669–1686: Algernon May.
- 1686–1689: Robert Brady.
- 1689–1707?: William Petyt.
- 1707–1730: Richard Topham.
- 1712: John Anstis.
- 1730–1754: David Polhill.
- 1754–1755: William Hay.
- 1755–1783: John Shelley.
- 1783–?: Thomas Astle.
- 1803–1819: Samuel Lysons.
- 1819–1840: Henry Petrie.
