= John Digons =

16th-century English politician

John Digons (1500/1 – 1585), of Chichester, Sussex, was an English politician.

Digons was Mayor of Chichester for 1548–49, 1556–57 and 1567–68 and elected member of parliament for Chichester in November 1554.

He was buried at Chichester Cathedral.
