= William Howard (died 1672) =

English politician, died 1672

Sir William Howard (c. 1599 – by 7 August 1672) of Tollesbury Hall, Essex was an English courtier and member of Parliament.

He was the 4th surviving son of Thomas Howard, 1st Earl of Suffolk by his wife Catherine. In 1616 he inherited the manor of Tollesbury, Essex on the death of his elder brother Henry. He was created a Knight of the Bath alongside two of his brothers in November 1616, when Charles became Prince of Wales. He became a gentleman of the privy chamber to the prince and was among those who were sent after him to Spain in 1623. He sat for Cricklade, where his father was the major electoral patron, in the parliaments of 1624, 1625 and 1626.

He was a lieutenant in the band of gentleman pensioners from 1639 to at least 1642.

He became the member for Old Sarum in the Short Parliament, probably through the influence of William Cecil, 2nd Earl of Salisbury, a moderate voice in the House of Lords. Following the outbreak of the English Civil War, he joined the king at Oxford, but appears to have played little part in the conflict and made his composition in 1646.

He made his will in July 1672 and died shortly after.
