= Reversionary lease =

A reversionary lease is a lease that does not commence until some future date.

In Australia, legislation restricts such leases. Such a lease would be void if the lease takes effect more than 21 years from the date that of the instrument.

A reversionary lease is to be distinguished from a lease of a reversion which is when the landlord after granting a lease to lessee 1 and later grants a lease of the same property to lessee 2 for the same or different period. In such cases, lessee 2 will become the new landlord for lessee 1 (lessee 1 pay rents to lessee 2) and lessee 2 has to pay rent to the original landlord.
