= Thomas Hayne (MP) =

English politician

Thomas Hayne (fl. 1401) of Chichester, Sussex, was an English politician.

He was a member (MP) of the parliament of England for Chichester in 1401.
