= John Hebbe =

English politician

John Hebbe (fl. 1397), of Fishbourne, Sussex, was an English politician.

He was a Member (MP) of the Parliament of England for Chichester in January 1397.
