= Humphrey Haggett =

Humphrey Haggett (5 January 1601 – by 26 November 1634) was an English politician who sat in the House of Commons in 1625 and 1626.

Haggett was the son of Humphrey Haggett, of London. He was admitted to Merchant Taylors' School in 1613 and matriculated at St John's College, Oxford on 12 November 1619, aged 17. He became a student of Gray's Inn in 1624. In 1625, he was elected Member of Parliament for Chichester. He was re-elected MP for Chichester in 1626.

Parliament of England
Preceded by Sir Thomas Edmondes; Thomas Whatman	Member of Parliament for Chichester; 1625–1626; With: Algernon Lord Peircy	Succeeded by William Cawley; Henry Bellingham
