= Lawrence Ardren =

16th-century English politician

Lawrence Ardren, Ardran or Ardern (by 1523 – 1570), of Chichester, Sussex, was an English politician.

== Career ==
He was Mayor of Chichester for 1564 and elected a Member of Parliament (MP) for Chichester in 1558.
