= Thomas Patching =

English politician

Thomas Patching (fl. 1386–1408) of Chichester, Sussex, was an English politician.

He was a member (MP) of the parliament of England for Chichester in 1386, February 1388, January 1390, 1391, 1393, September 1397 and 1399. He was Mayor of Chichester Michaelmas in 1407–08.
