= Adrian Stoughton =

English politician

Adrian Stoughton (1556–1614), of Stoughton, Surrey and West Stoke, near Chichester, Sussex, was an English politician.

He was the son of Thomas Stoughton, MP and the brother of Laurence Stoughton, MP. Educated at the Inner Temple, he was called to the bar in 1587. He was the Recorder of Chichester from 1600.

He was a member (MP) of the Parliament of England for Haslemere in 1593 and for Chichester in 1597, 1601, 1604 and 1614.

He married c.1583, Mary, the daughter of William Jordyn of Chitterne, Wiltshire, with whom he had 16 children, including 2 sons and 6 daughters.
