= William S. Hoar =

William S. Hoar, OC FRSC (August 31, 1913, Moncton NB – June 13, 2006, Vancouver BC) was a professor and head of department of zoology at the University of British Columbia. He received an Order of Canada award on June 26, 1974. He also had several other degrees and diplomas, some of which were honorary (LLD from SFU in 1998), and others of which were earned the old-fashioned hard-work way (DSc). He was, first and foremost, a grandfather, husband and father. A patient man who was very involved with his family, he was also very well known in the zoology world, and has a series of lectures named after him, that are given every year at UBC. Hoar married on August 13, 1941. His wife was Margaret (Myra) MacRae MacKenzie from Scotland. He and Myra jointly wrote "A Hebridean Heritage" on Myra's family ancestry. Prior to that, Hoar had already written other books on his family history, including "By Way of New England" and "Steeves and Colpitts: Pioneers of the Upper Petitcodiac". His passion was for genealogy when he retired, but having had prior success as a well published zoology professor, he knew his way around book writing and editing. His "baby" from the zoology years was General and Comparative Physiology . His later family history books were written on his own company's press, called "Tangled Roots Press".

Long before having children, Hoar worked with Charles Best, co-discoverer of insulin. Hoar met his wife Myra in an elevator one day, carrying rabbits in his hand for animal testing. It was not love at first sight; they became friends first, and when he eventually proposed to her, she answered that she "would have to think about it" rather than an absolute yes or no. However, evidently she ultimately agreed and they settled down to married life. They were married 50+ years when Myra died, a long and happy marriage.

Hoar suffered from poliomyelitis as a boy, which left him with a smaller withered leg. He was a proud man and never fussed over his minor handicap. Ultimately he also was affected by post-polio syndrome much later in life. In his later years he enjoyed sushi lunches, and lunches out with his old boys' club from his university faculty days. He was a very well read and well educated man who continued to read long non-fiction books into his 90s. His ultimate demise was mostly age-related.

Hoar is survived by 3 children, 7 grandchildren, 10 great-grandchildren (7 of whom were already born at the time of his death), and 2 great-great grandchildren (born after his death). His 4th biological child died before he died. His surviving children are Stewart George, David Innes, and Melanie Frances.
