= Richard May (politician) =

English politician (c.1638 – 1713)

Richard May (c. 1638 – 1713), of the Middle Temple and Grey Friars, Chichester, Sussex, was an English politician.

He was a member (MP) of the parliament of England for Chichester on 6 November 1673, March 1679 and 1685.
