= Richard Lewknor (died 1616) =

16th-century English politician

Richard Lewknor (bapt. 14 March 1541 – 6 April 1616) of Downeley, West Dean, Sussex, was an English politician.

== Family ==
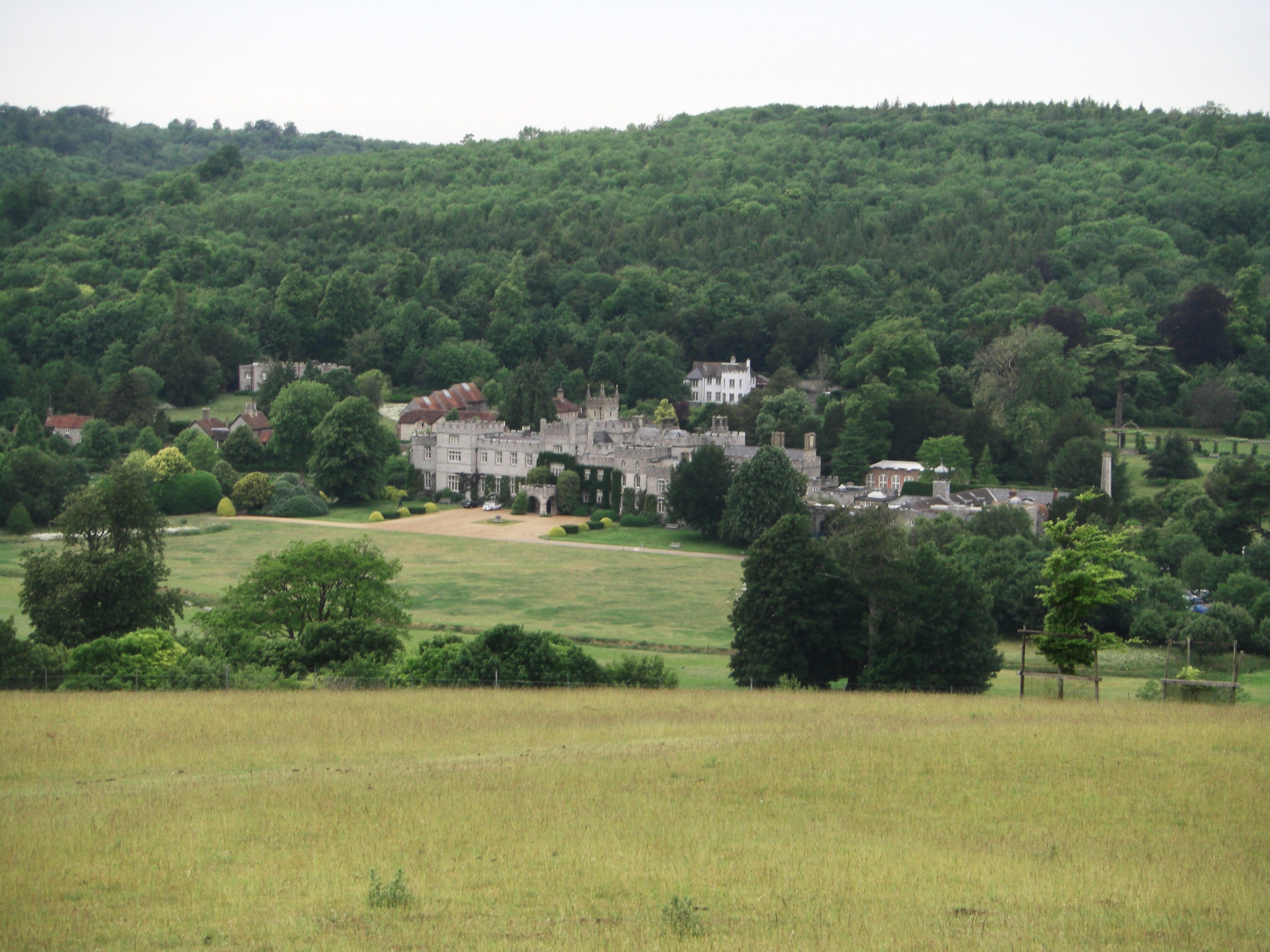
West Dean House as rebuilt in 1738

Lewknor was the son of Edmund Lewknor of Tangmere, Sussex and Jane Tirell. He was the brother of Thomas Lewknor. He was baptised on 14 March 1542. He was educated at the Middle Temple and there called to the bar.

== Career ==
Lewknor was made a bencher in 1581 and sergeant-at-law in 1594. He was appointed Recorder of Chichester from 1588 to 1590 and a judge on the Chester circuit in 1589, where he was promoted to be Chief Justice of Chester in 1603, a position he held until his death. As a judge he was impartial although a staunch Catholic, even sentencing four Catholic priests to death. He also held a number of public commissions during his career and was knighted in 1600.

Lewknor was elected Member (MP) of the Parliament of England for Chichester in 1572, 1584, 1586, 1589, 1593 and 1597. In Parliament he sat on a number of committees.

Lewknor moved to Wales after his appointment as Chief Justice of Chester and effectively ran the country for some time between the death in 1601 of Henry Herbert, 2nd Earl of Pembroke, the Lord President of Wales and the arrival of the new Lord President, Lord Zouch, in 1602.

== Private life ==
Lewknor married twice. His first wife is unknown, but his second wife was Margaret Atkins, daughter of Thomas Atkins. From his first marriage, he had two sons. He died on 6 April 1616.

In 1589, Lewknor bought the manor of West Dean, which was left to his grandson Richard Lewknor at his death in 1616.
