= Robert Bowyer II =

English politician (died c. 1568)

Robert Bowyer II (by 1529 – 1567/68), of the Middle Temple, London and Chichester, Sussex, was an English politician.

== Career ==
He was a member of parliament (MP) for Chichester in 1555 and 1559.
