= List of Bolton Wanderers F.C. players (25–99 appearances) =

Bolton Wanderers F.C. is an English association football club based in Horwich, Greater Manchester. The club was formed in Bolton in 1874 as Christ Church F.C., and played their first competitive match in October 1881, when they entered the First Round of the 1881–82 FA Cup. The club was renamed Bolton Wanderers F.C. in 1877, and they moved to Burnden Park in 1895 and the Reebok Stadium in 1997. The club won its first significant trophy in 1923 by beating West Ham United in the first FA Cup Final to be played at Wembley Stadium. Over the next forty years the club won a further 3 FA Cups. The club has gained promotion to the Premier League one three separate occasions; first in 1995, then again in 1997, with each term lasting for only one season on each occasion, before again gaining promotion in 2001.

Since playing their first competitive match, more than 850 players have made a competitive first-team appearance for the club, many of whom have played between 25 and 99 matches (including substitute appearances).

Six players have fallen one short of 100 appearances for Bolton Wanderers, John Slater and Evan Jones, whose appearances were reduced due to the first World War, Harry McShane and Jack Bradley, who both played for the club between 1947 and 1951, Dorian Dervite who played between 2014 and 2018 and Victor Adeboyejo who played between 2023 and 2026. John Owen, who appeared between 1906 and 1911 played 98 times for the club. English forward John McAtee is the player still at the club closest to 100 appearances, having played 94 matches for Bolton Wanderers.

As of November 2026, a total of 315 players have played between 25 and 99 competitive matches for the club. Of those players, ten are still playing for the club and can add to their total.

== List of players ==
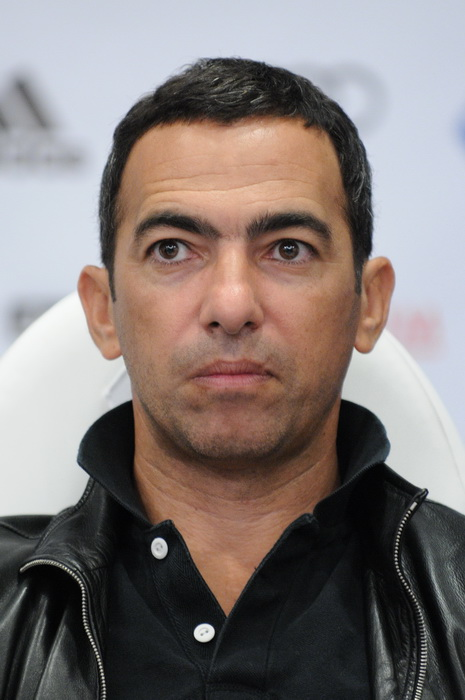
Youri Djorkaeff

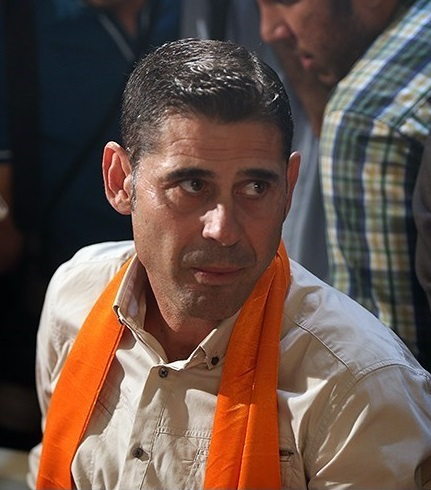
Fernando Hierro

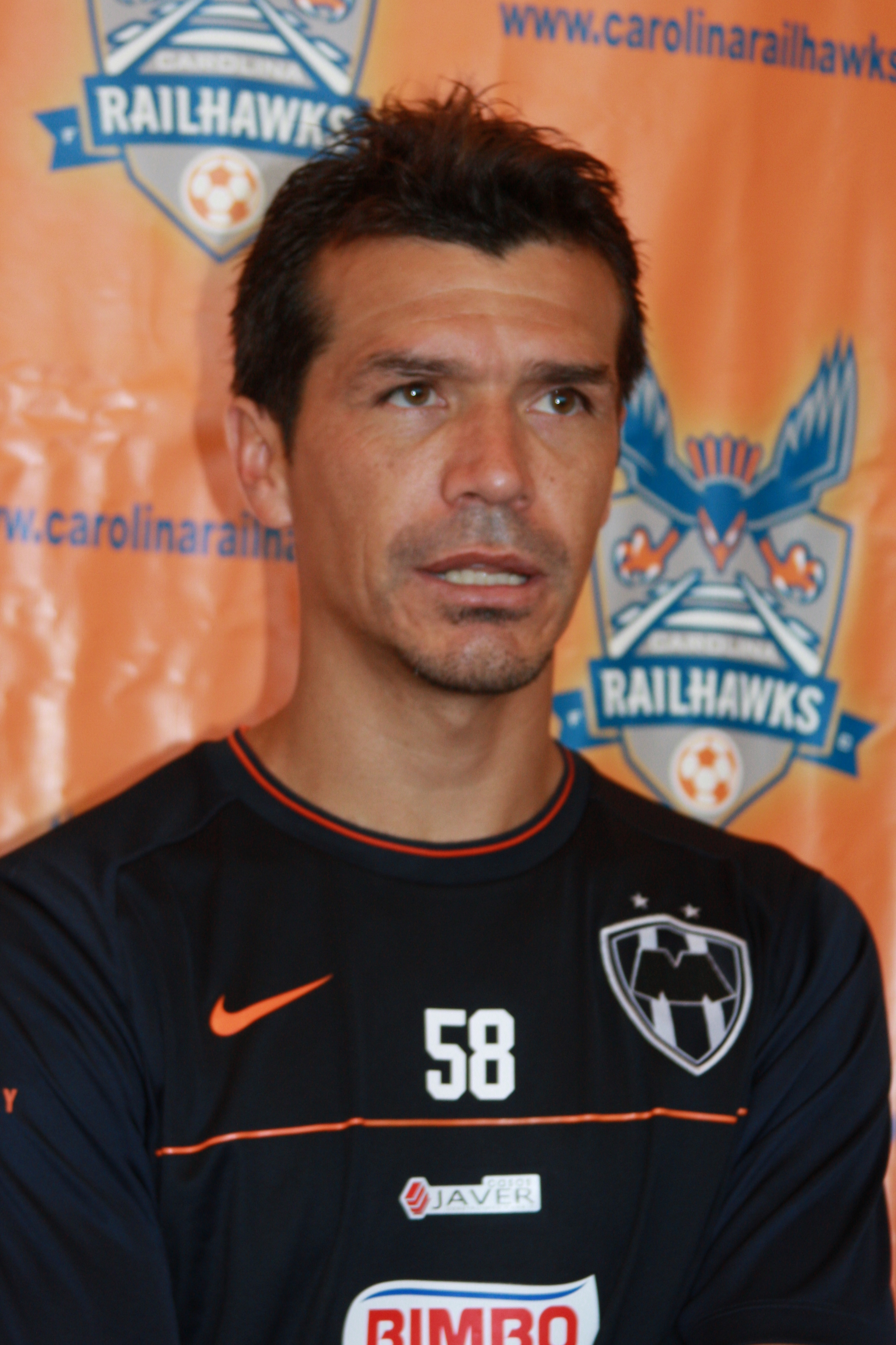
Jared Borgetti

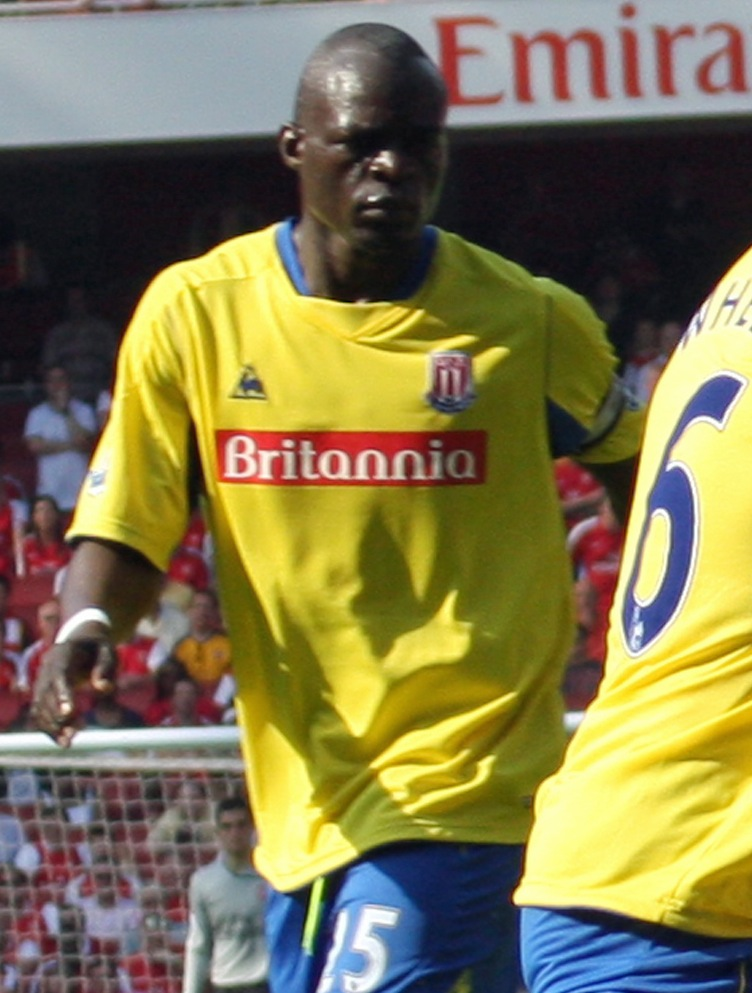
Abdoulaye Faye

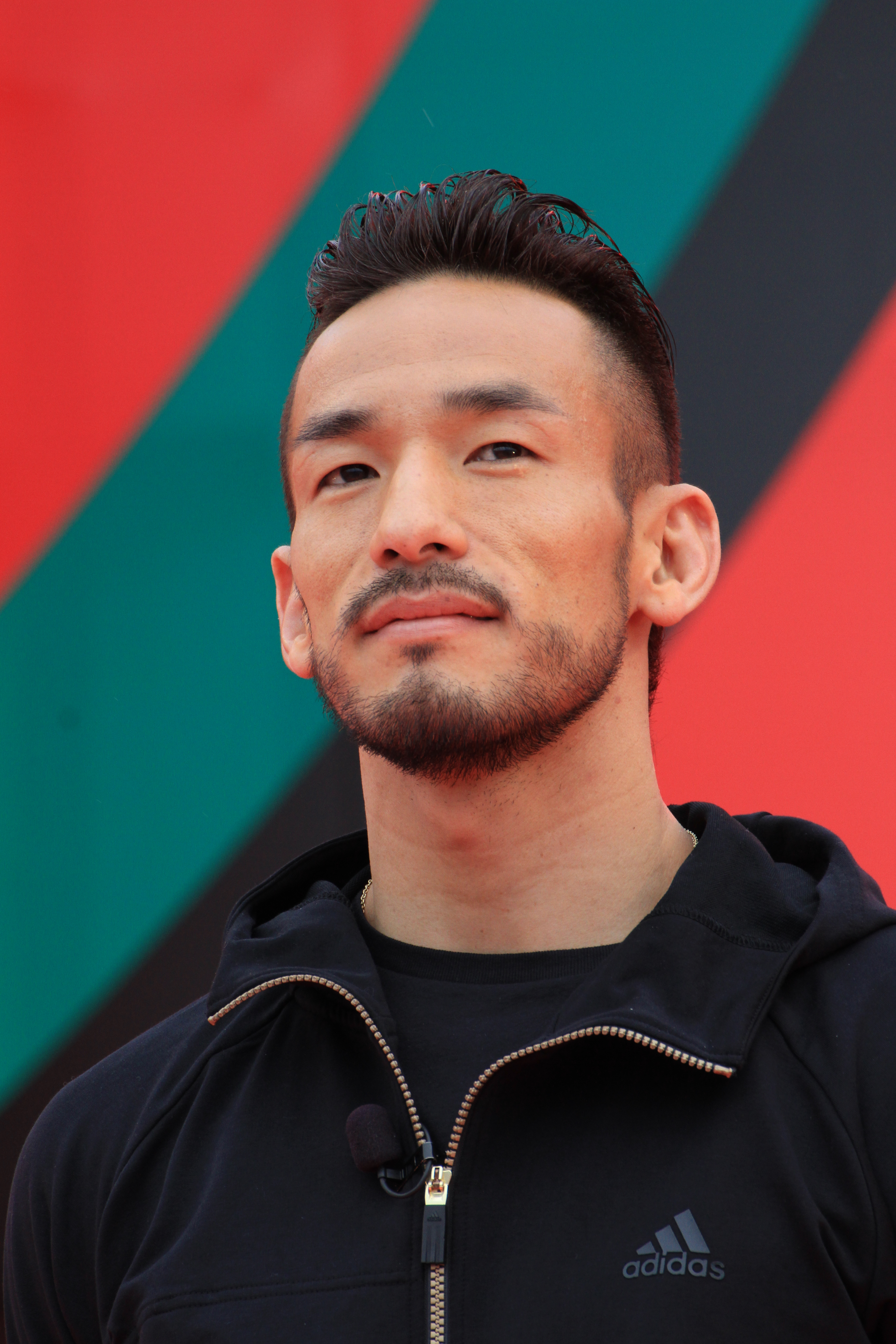
Hidetoshi Nakata

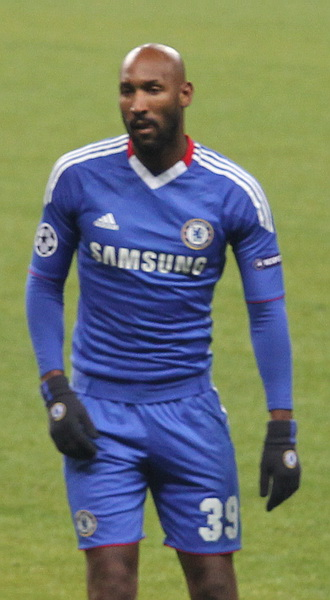
Nicolas Anelka

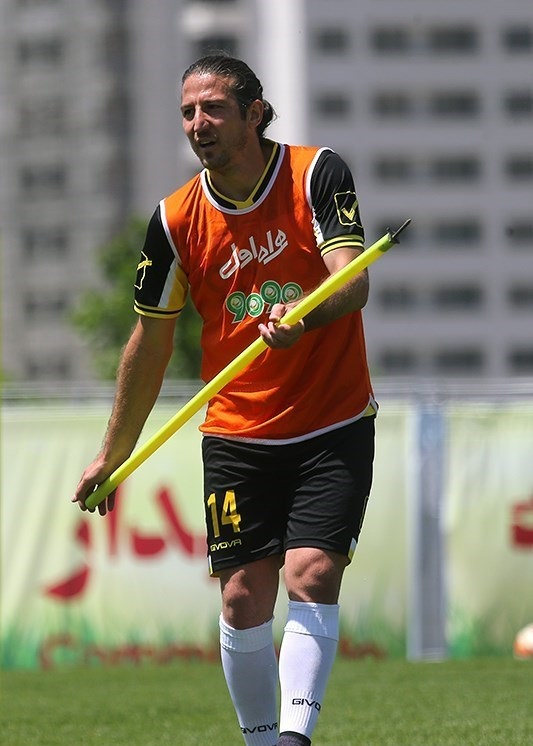
Andranik Teymourian

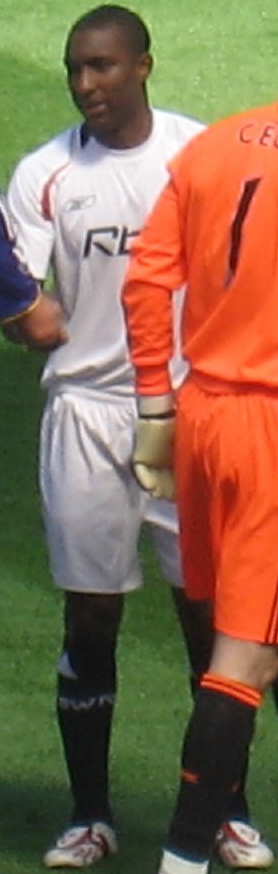
Jlloyd Samuel

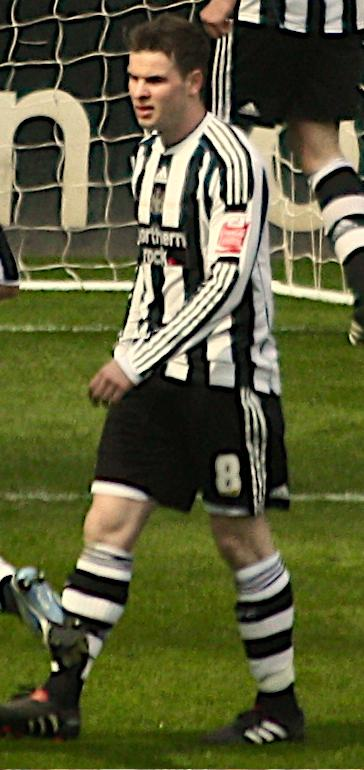
Danny Guthrie

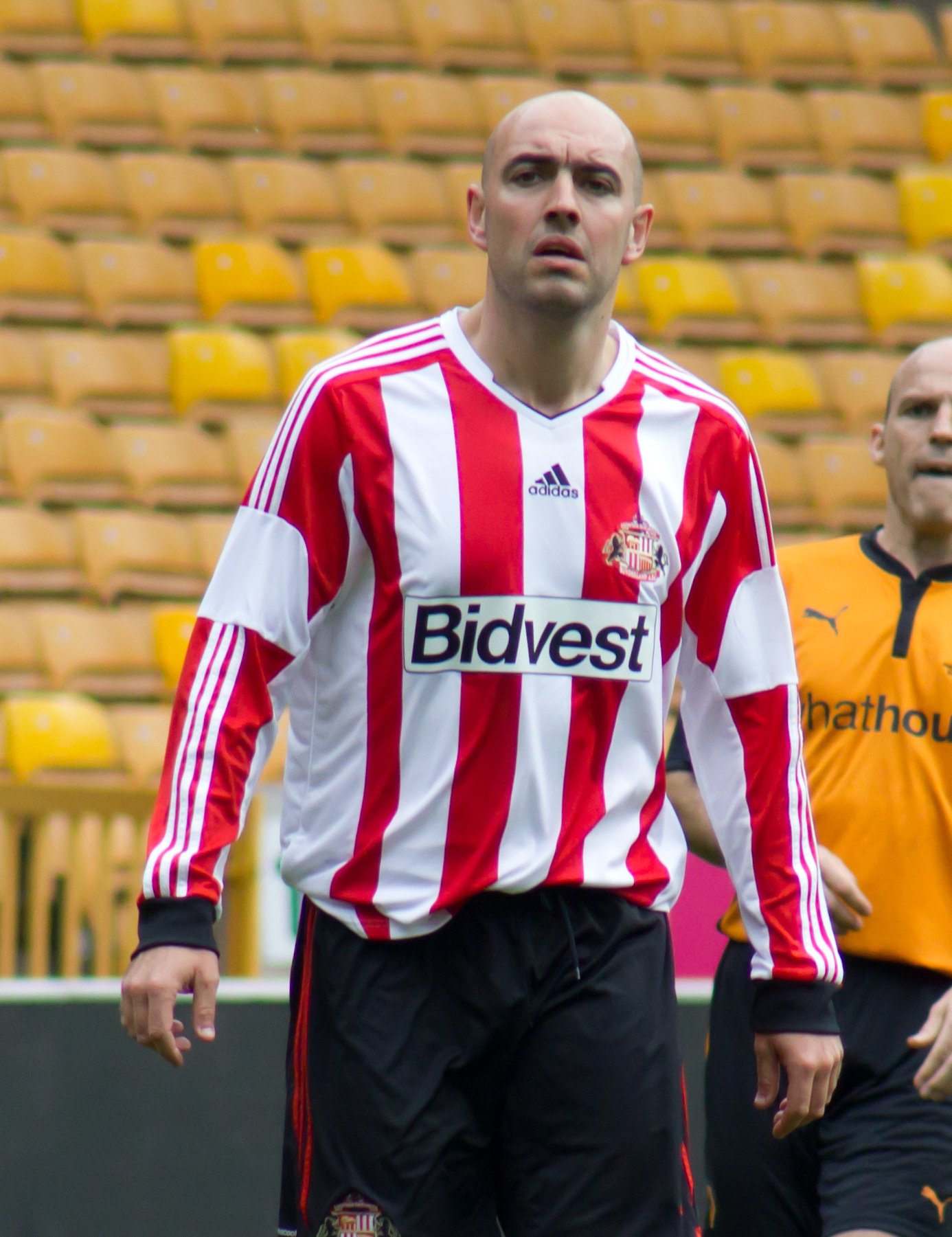
Gavin McCann

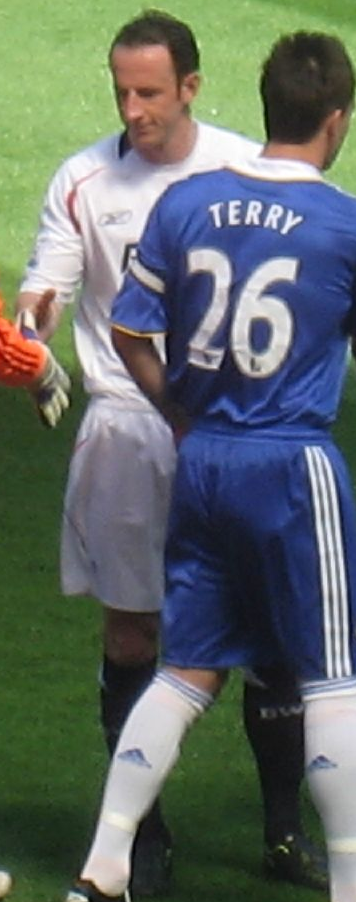
Andy O'Brien

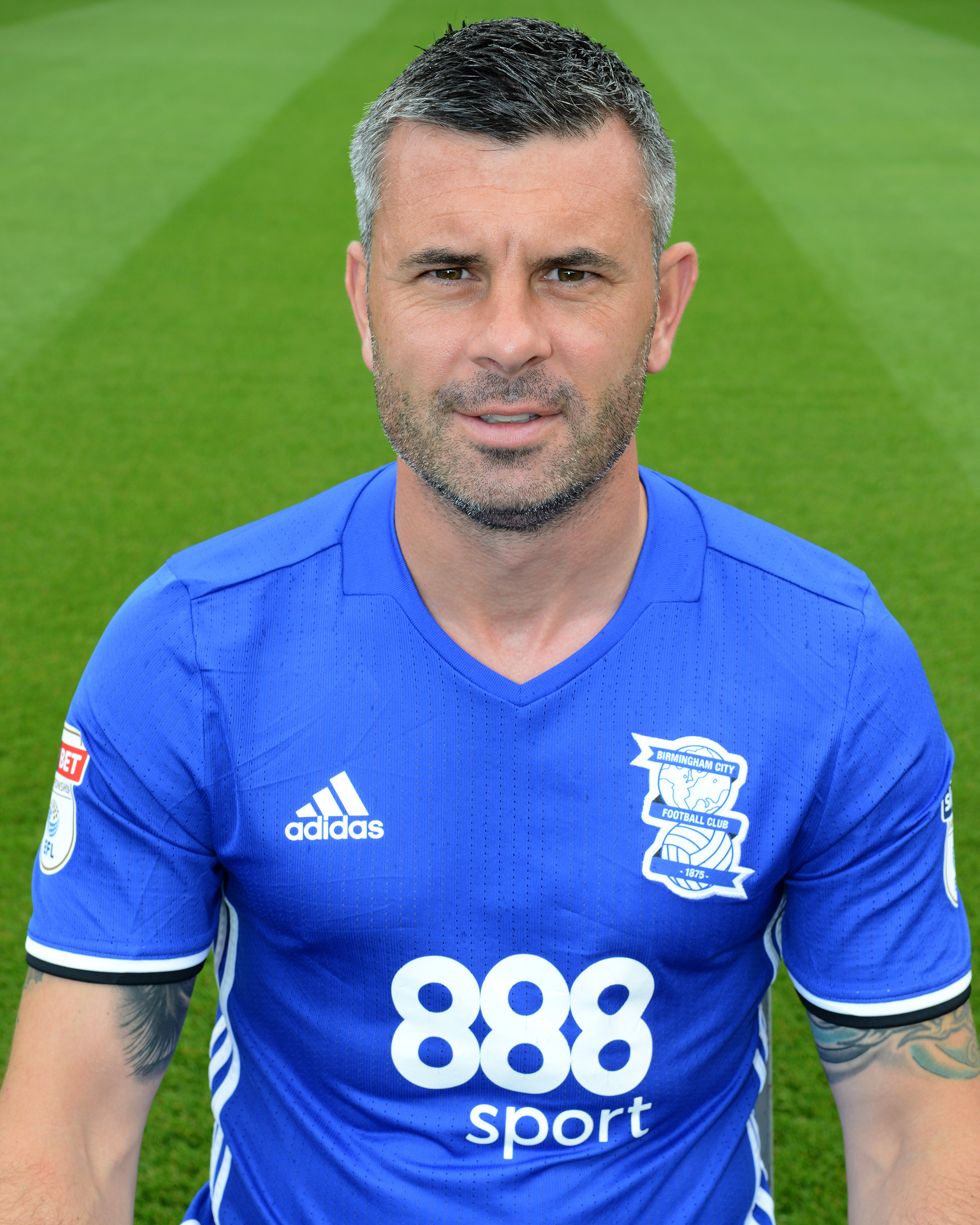
Paul Robinson

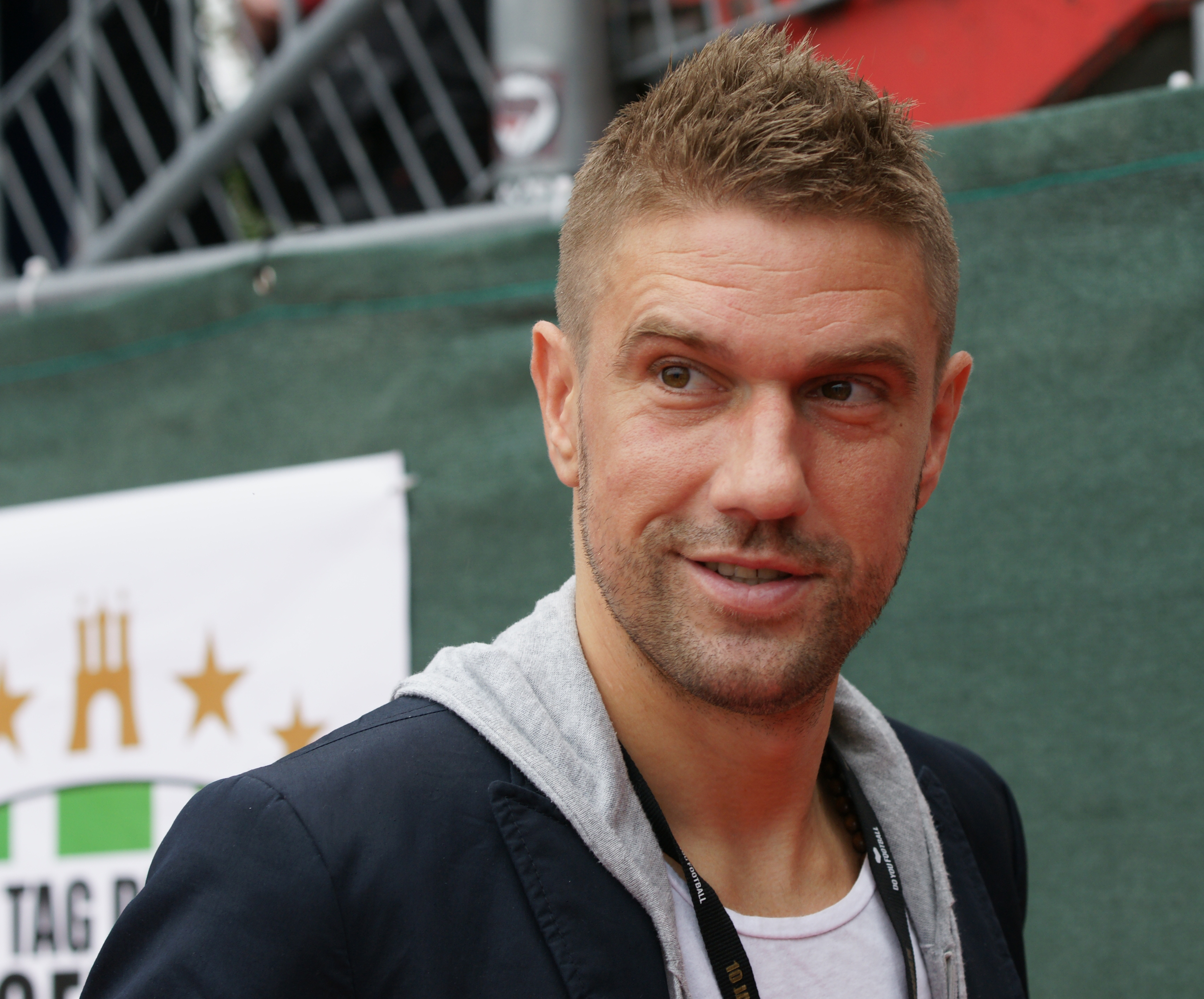
Ivan Klasnic

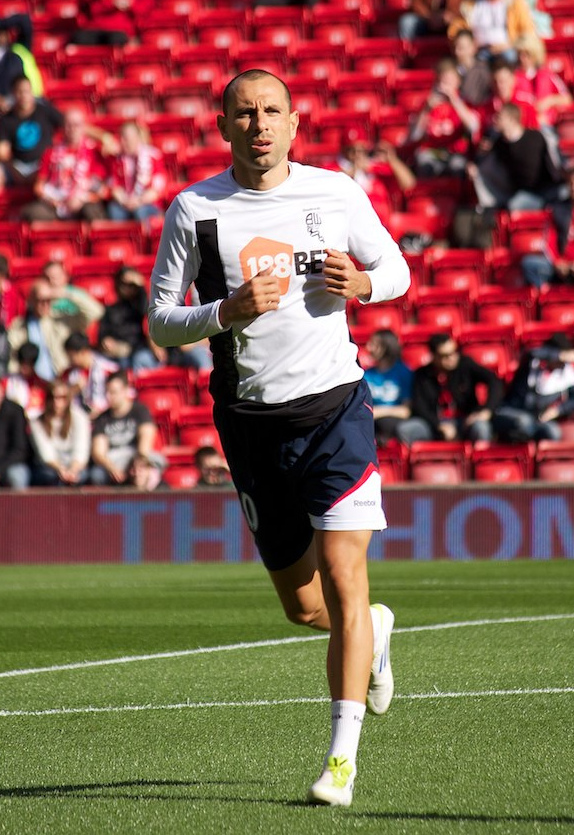
Martin Petrov

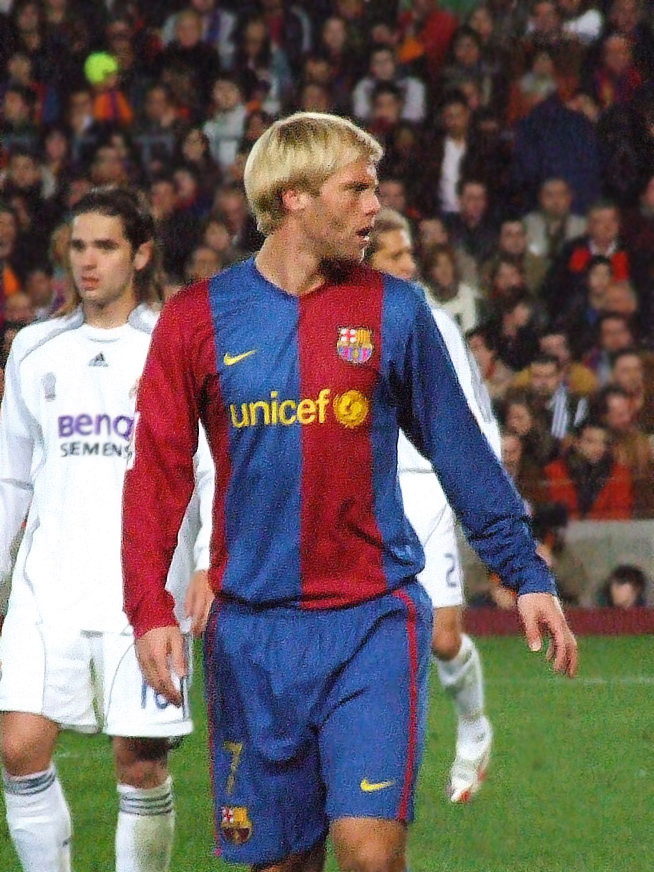
Eiður Guðjohnsen

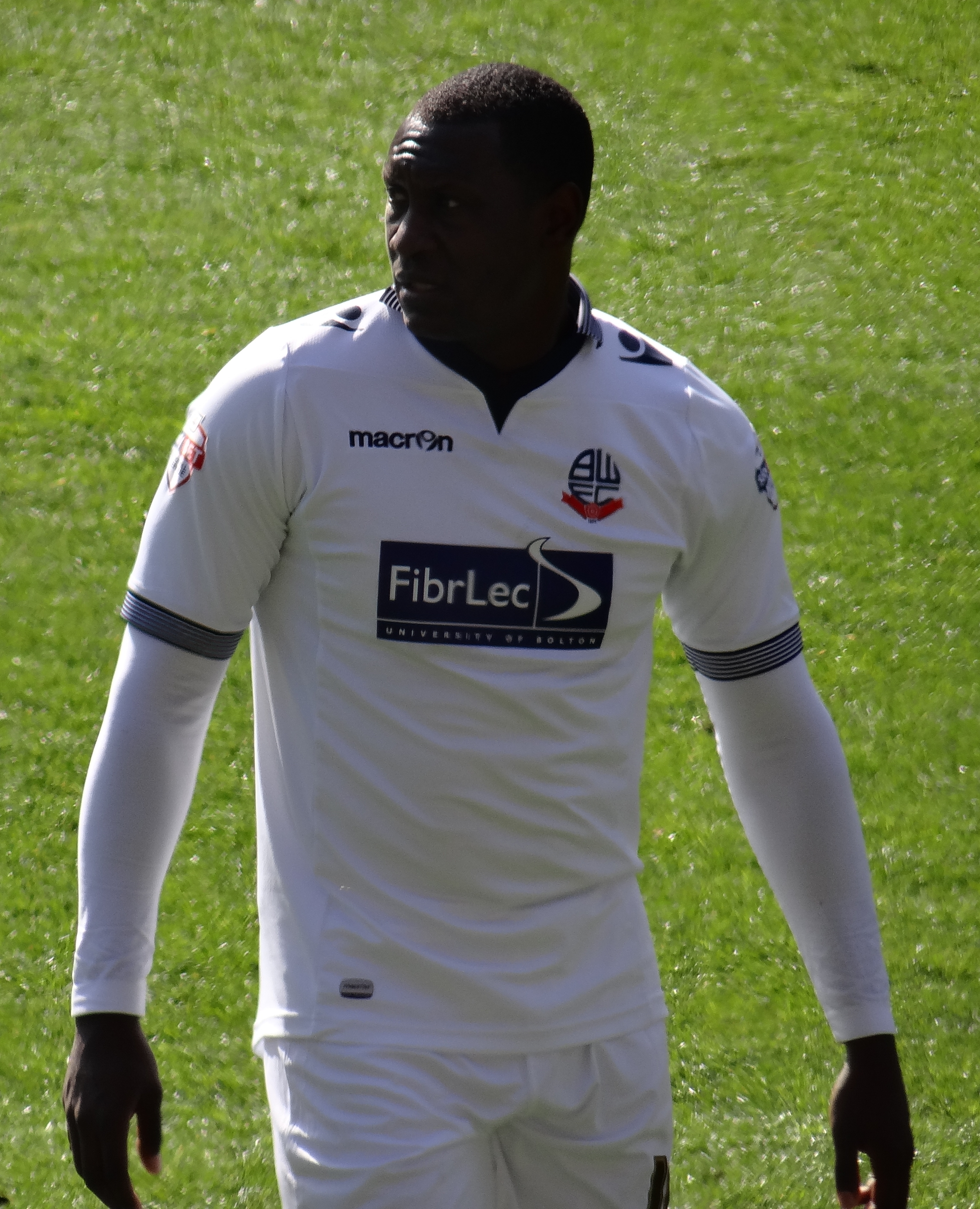
Emile Heskey

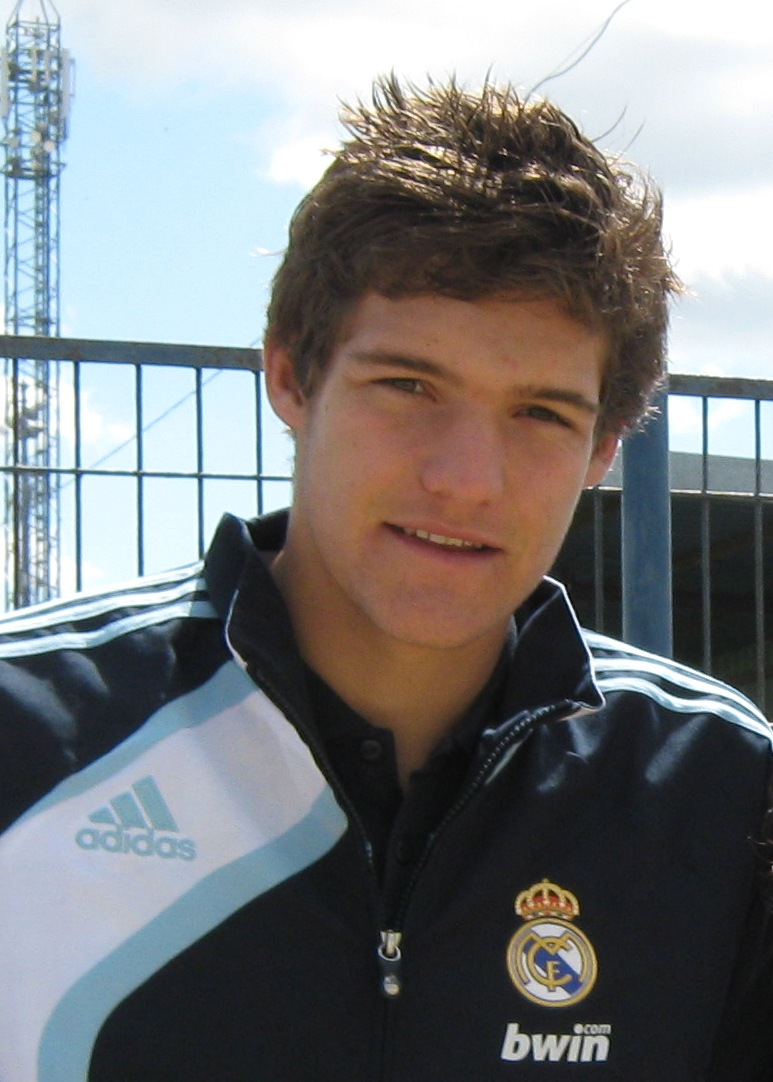
Marcos Alonso

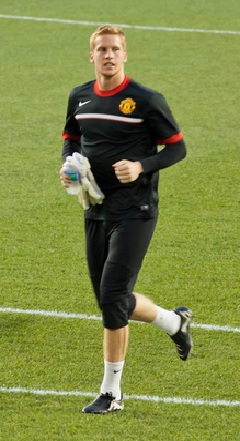
Ben Amos

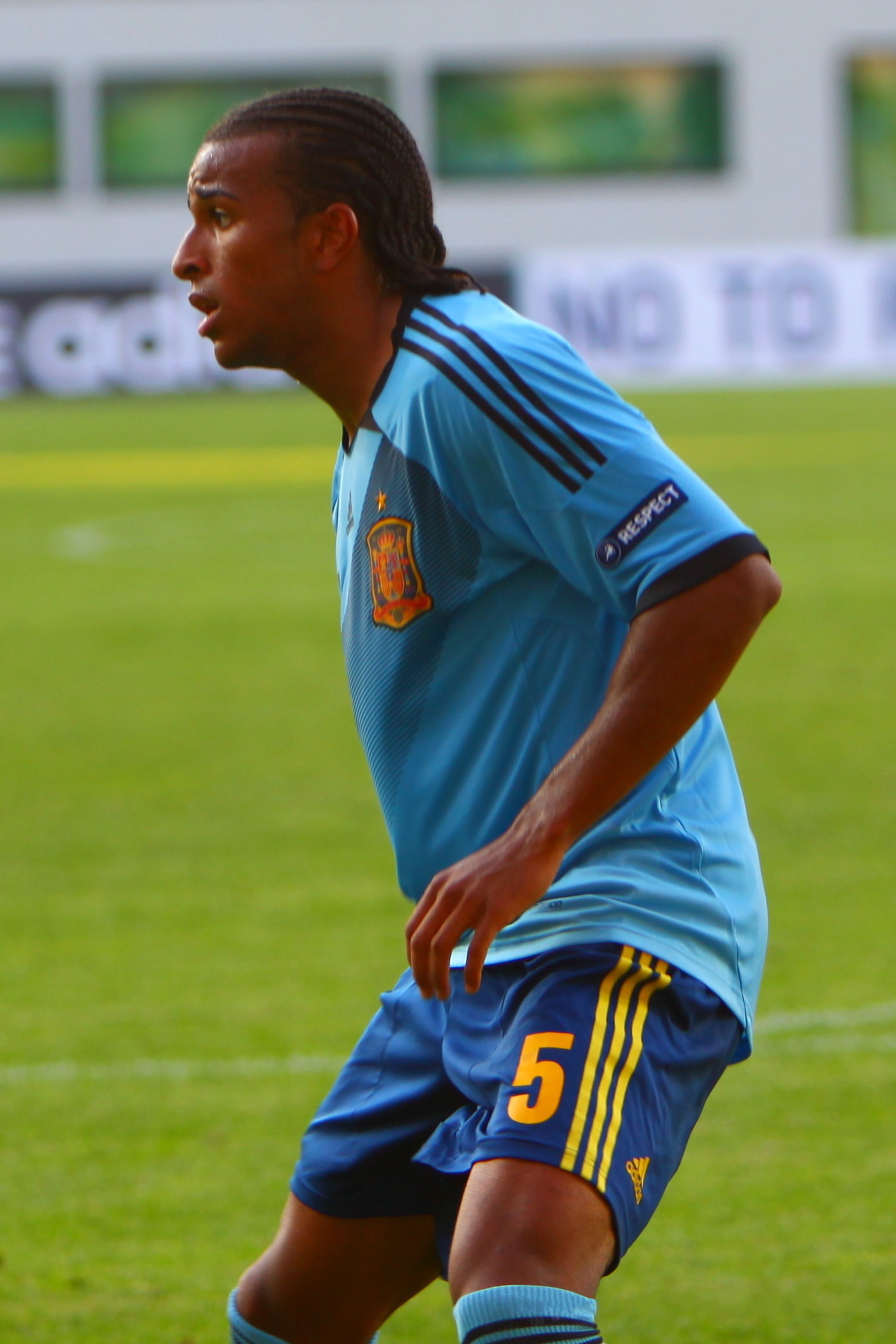
Derik Osede

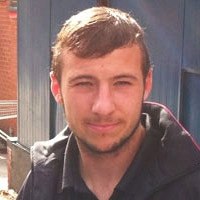
Adam Le Fondre

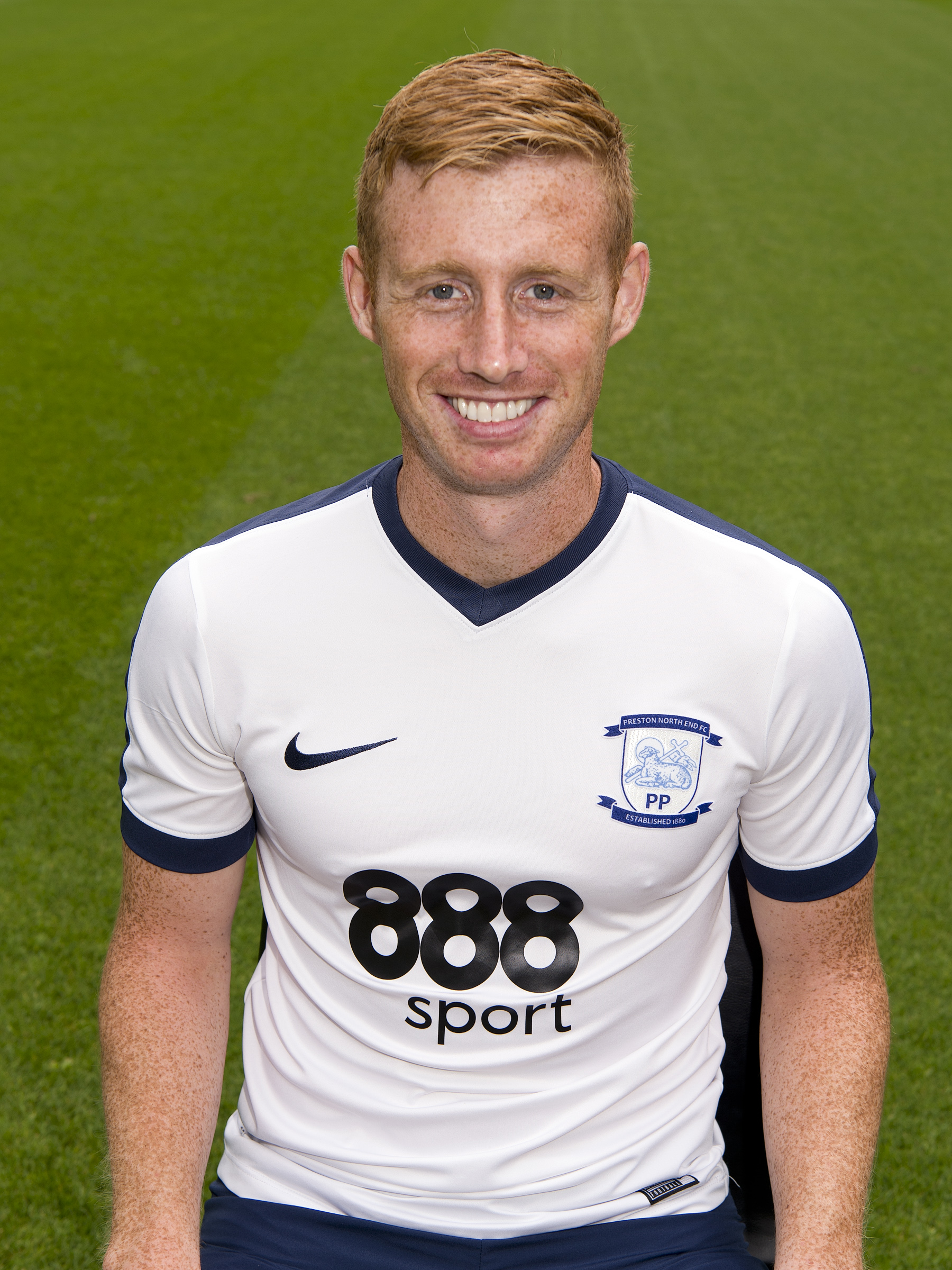
Eoin Doyle

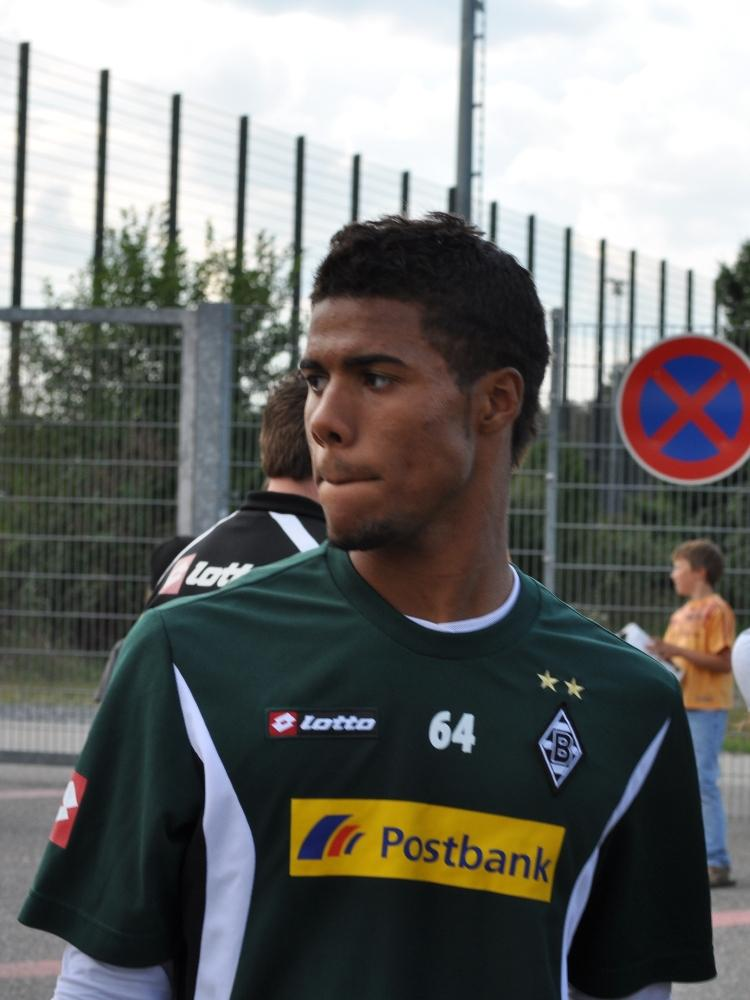
Elias Kachunga

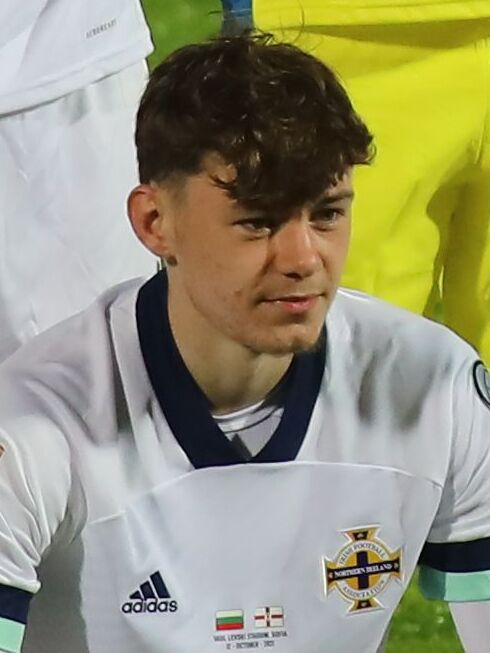
Conor Bradley
- Appearances and goals are for first-team competitive matches only, including Premier League, Football League, FA Cup, League Cup, EFL Trophy, Charity Shield and UEFA Cup; wartime matches are regarded as unofficial and are excluded, as are matches from the abandoned 1939–40 season.
- Players are listed according to the date of their first team debut for the club.

Statistics correct as of match played 21 November 2026

Table headers

- Nationality – If a player played international football, the country or countries he played for are shown. Otherwise, the player's nationality is given as his country of birth.
- Bolton Wanderers career – The year of the player's first appearance for Bolton Wanderers to the year of his last appearance.
- Starts – The number of games started.
- Sub – The number of games played as a substitute.
- Total – The total number of games played, both as a starter and as a substitute.

Positions key
Pre-1960s		Post-1960s	
GK	Goalkeeper		
FB	Full back	DF	Defender
HB	Half back	MF	Midfielder
FW	Forward		
U	Utility player^{1}		

Name	Nationality	Position	Bolton Wanderers career	Starts	Subs	Total	Goals	Ref
Name	Nationality	Position	Bolton Wanderers career	Appearances			Goals	Ref
James Brogan	Scotland	FW	1884–1892	86	0	86	32	
Alexander Barbour	Scotland	FW	1888–1892	35	0	35	17	
P.A. Bullough			1888–1893	52	0	52	5	
Kenny Davenport	England	FW	1888–1893	77	0	77	36	
J. Milne			1888–1890	39	0	39	9	
James Parkinson	England	GK	1888–1891	38	0	38	1	
Robert Roberts	Wales	HB	1888–1892	85	0	85	5	
B. Robinson			1888–1891	41	0	41	1	
David Weir	England	FW	1888–1890; 1892-1895	92	0	92	41	
James McNee			1889–1893	96	0	96	25	
Harry Gardiner	Scotland	DF	1890–1894	84	0	84	5	
Jimmy Munro	Scotland	FW	1890–1893	52	0	52	21	
Handel Bentley	England	FW	1891–1895	50	0	50	19	
David McFetteridge	Scotland	FW	1891–1893	27	0	27	5	
James Dickenson			1892–1894	47	0	47	13	
Robert Tannahill	Scotland	FW	1892–1897	80	0	80	11	
Davie Willocks	Scotland	FW	1892–1894	36	0	36	8	
Jim Wilson	Scotland	FW	1892–1894	41	0	41	10	
Bill Joyce	Scotland	FW	1894–1897	33	0	33	18	
Jimmy McGeachan	Scotland	DF	1894–1898	81	0	81	5	
David Nicoll	Scotland	FW	1895–1902	65	0	65	11	
Tom Miller	England	FW	1896–1899	53	0	53	13	
Bob Thomson			1896–1899	49	0	49	6	
G. Lockhart			1897–1900	28	0	28	0	
Charlie Henderson	England	FW	1898–1899	29	0	29	14	
Hugh Morgan	Scotland	FW	1898–1901	47	0	47	16	
Robert Davies	England	DF	1895–1899	30	0	30	0	
William Halley	England	DF	1897–1901	41	0	41	0	
Jimmy Hanson	England	MF	1898–1904	67	0	67	9	
Tom McAteer	Scotland	DF	1898–1902	62	0	62	10	
James McKee	Scotland	FW	1900–1903	85	0	85	20	
William Tracey	England	FW	1900–1903	59	0	59	11	
Fred Halliday	England	DF	1901–1903	30	0	41	0	
Charlie Ostick	England	DF	1901–1906	87	0	87	0	
Tom Barlow	England	FW	1898–1902; 1903–1904	90	0	90	25	
Bill Bannister	England	DF	1901–1903	30	0	30	3	
Herbert Broomfield	England	GK	1902–1907	28	0	28	0	
Billy Yenson	England	FW	1903–1905	34	0	34	10	
William Robinson	England	HB	1905–1909	32	0	32	0	
J. Stanley		DF	1905–1910	71	0	71	0	
W.S. Cameron			1906–1908	31	0	31	7	
Jackie Owen	Scotland	MF	1906–1911	98	0	98	20	
John Slater		DF	1906–1919	99	0	99	0	
Jimmy Hogan	England	FW	1908–1913	58	0	58	19	
Billy Hunter	Scotland	FW	1908–1912	55	0	55	16	
W. Stott			1908–1914	65	0	65	0	
Ernie Whiteside	England	DF	1908–1914	88	0	88	0	
Harold Hilton	England	FW	1909–1920	65	0	65	24	
Alf Bentley	England	FW	1910–1913	55	0	55	16	
Stan Gimblett			1911–1914	31	0	31	0	
Evan Jones	Wales		1912–1915	99	0	99	28	
Joe Thomas			1912–1915	36	0	36	0	
Bob Glendenning	England	HB	1913–1915	83	0	83	0	
George Lillycrop	England	FW	1913–1915	55	0	55	32	
G. Wilson			1914–1915	33	0	33	0	
Frank Drabble	England	GK	1919–1921	30	0	30	0	
W.E. Herbert		MF	1919–1922	35	0	35	7	
Joseph Hughes	England	GK	1919–1921	41	0	41	0	
Bruce Longworth		DF	1919–1924	82	0	82	0	
Andrew Watson	Scotland	DF	1919–1922	36	0	36	0	
Fred Hinton	England	DF	1920–1924	36	0	36	0	
Jimmy Jones	England	DF	1920–1922	70	0	70	0	
Nelson Howarth	England	MF	1922–1926	38	0	38	2	
Bill Baggett	England	FW	1923–1927	27	0	27	11	
W.J. Boston			1923–1929	39	0	39	3	
Rollo Jack	England	MF	1923–1929	31	9	31	9	
Harry Greenhalgh	England	DF	1924–1929	80	0	80	0	
J.W. Cope		DF	1925–1929	86	0	86	0	
Jack Round	England	MF	1925–1930	59	0	59	2	
Ernie Thornborough			1925–1930	80	0	80	0	
J.T. Wagstaffe			1925–1932	53	0	53	1	
John Gill	England	GK	1926–1930	42	0	42	0	
Jimmy McClelland	Scotland	FW	1927–1930	65	0	65	19	
Len Murphy			1927–1929	34	0	34	8	
Fred Kean	England	DF	1928–1931	89	0	89	1	
Harold Howarth		DF	1929–1934	61	0	61	0	
H.B. Church	England	DF	1930–1935	42	0	42	0	
Jack Rimmer	England	MF	1930–1937	83	0	83	16	
Tom Duckworth			1931–1933	29	0	29	0	
Tom Griffiths	Wales	DF	1931–1933	53	0	53	8	
George Nicholson	England	MF	1931–1936	71	0	71	1	
Jack Griffiths	England	DF	1932–1934	25	0	25	0	
George Walton	England	FW	1932–1937	28	0	28	3	
Ken Cameron	Scotland	FW	1933–1935	27	0	27	4	
John Connor	England	DF	1934–1939	36	0	36	0	
Jack Hurst	England	DF	1933–1947	73	0	73	2	
James Currier	England	FW	1935–1939	26	0	26	14	
Fred Swift			1935–1938	65	0	65	0	
Alf Anderson	Scotland	HB	1936–1939	57	0	57	5	
John Calder		FW	1936–1938	27	0	27	11	
Daniel Winter			1936–1939	37	0	37	0	
Albert Grosvenor			1937–1939	56	0	56	7	
Edward Rothwell	England		1937–1949	48	0	48	2	
Ernie Forrest	England	MF	1938–1948	73	0	73	1	
Albert Geldard	England	MF	1938–1947	39	0	39	2	
George Hunt	England	FW	1938–1946	51	0	50	26	
Reginald Elvy		DF	1946–1949	34	0	34	0	
Lol Hamlett	England	DF	1946–1949	85	0	85	9	
Danny Murphy	England	MF	1946–1951	76	0	76	1	
John Bradley	England	FW	1947–1951	99	0	99	20	
Walter Crook	England	DF	1947–1948	29	0	29	0	
Harry McShane	Scotland	MF	1947–1951	99	0	99	7	
Jimmy Hernon	Scotland	MF	1948–1951	43	0	43	2	
William Hughes			1948–1952	49	0	49	2	
Ronnie Codd	England	MF	1950–1954	31	0	31	5	
Ken Grieves	Australia	GK	1951–1956	50	0	50	0	
George Higgins	Scotland	DF	1951–1954	73	0	73	0	
Tommy Neill	Scotland	DF	1952–1957	42	0	42	3	
Terry Allcock	England	FW	1953–1958	32	0	32	11	
Neville Bannister	England	MF	1955–1961	26	0	26	4	
John Threlfall			1955–1963	49	0	49	1	
James Cunliffe		DF	1957–1963	33	0	33	0	
Peter Deakin	England	FW	1957–1964	73	0	73	15	
Charlie Cooper	England	DF	1960–1969	86	4	90	0	
Billy McAdams	Northern Ireland	FW	1960–1962	52	0	52	29	
Brian Pilkington	England	MF	1960–1963	86	0	86	11	
Ron McGarry	England	FW	1961–1963	28	0	28	7	
Dennis Butler	England	MF	1962–1968	56	0	56	0	
John Napier	Northern Ireland	DF	1963–1967	74	0	74	2	
Arthur Marsh	England	DF	1966–1971	77	2	70	0	
Paul Fletcher	England	FW	1968–1971	38	4	42	7	
Paul Hallows	England	DF	1968–1974	53	2	55	0	
John Manning	England	FW	1968–1971	30	2	32	8	
Alan Boswell	England	MF	1969–1971	66	3	69	13	
Roger Hunt	England	FW	1969–1972	77	7	84	25	
Charlie Hurley	Republic of Ireland	DF	1969–1971	45	1	46	3	
Jimmy Redfern	England	MF	1969–1973	22	6	28	3	
Ian Seddon	England	MF	1969–1973	61	15	76	4	
Henry Mowbray	Scotland	DF	1971–1973	40	0	40	0	
Ralph Wright	England	MF	1971–1973	27	7	34	5	
Hugh Curran	Scotland	FW	1974–1977	43	7	50	13	
Brian Smith	England	MF	1974–1979	50	7	57	4	
Steve Taylor	England	FW	1974–1977	44	6	50	20	
Mike Graham	England	DF	1977–1981	65	7	72	3	
Mike Bennett	England	DF	1977–1981	48	3	51	0	
Terry Poole	England	GK	1977–1981	30	0	30	0	
Ray Train	England	MF	1977–1978	55	2	57	0	
Frank Worthington	England	FW	1977–1979	88	4	92	38	
Neil McNab	Scotland	MF	1978–1980	37	2	39	4	
Len Cantello	England	MF	1979–1982	96	1	97	3	
Michael Carter	England	FW	1979–1982	43	13	56	8	
Dave Clement	England	DF	1979–1981	39	0	39	0	
Tadeusz Nowak	Poland	FW	1979–1981	23	4	27	1	
Chris Thompson	England	FW	1979–1983	72	9	81	20	
Phil Wilson	England	MF	1979–1981	38	4	42	4	
Brian Kidd	England	FW	1980–1982	46	3	49	16	
Dušan Nikolić	Yugoslavia	MF	1980–1982	25	0	25	2	
Neil Berry	Scotland	MF	1981–1985	30	9	39	1	
Mike Doyle	England	DF	1981–1983	42	0	42	4	
Tony Henry	England	MF	1981–1982	76	0	76	24	
Steve Whitworth	England	DF	1981–1983	73	0	73	0	
Ian Moores	England	FW	1982–1983	26	4	30	5	
Neil Redfearn	England	MF	1982–1984	41	0	41	1	
Peter Valentine	England	DF	1983–1985	79	2	81	1	
Mark Gavin	Scotland	MF	1985–1987	64	1	65	5	
Phil Neal	England	DF	1985–1989	73	12	85	3	
Nicky Brookman	England	FW	1986–1990	60	11	71	12	
Steve Elliott	England	FW	1986–1989	73	3	76	11	
Mike Salmon	England	GK	1986–1987	36	0	36	0	
Gary Henshaw	England	MF	1987–1991	65	25	90	5	
Trevor Morgan	England	FW	1987–1989	78	12	90	20	
Ian Stevens	England	FW	1987–1991	34	24	59	9	
Paul Comstive	England	MF	1989–1992	57	10	67	5	
Neil Fisher	England	FW	1989–1995	22	7	29	1	
Mickey Brown	England	MF	1991–1993	32	7	39	3	
Nicky Spooner	England	DF	1991–1998	27	2	29	2	
Andy Walker	Scotland	FW	1991–1994	78	9	87	55	
Jason Lydiate	England	DF	1992–1995	36	1	37	0	
Owen Coyle	Republic of Ireland	FW	1993–1996	55	23	78	23	
Aidan Davison	Northern Ireland	GK	1993–1997	47	2	49	0	
Simon Coleman	England	DF	1994–1998	40	0	40	5	
Fabian de Freitas	Netherlands	FW	1994–1996	27	22	49	9	
Mixu Paatelainen	Finland	FW	1994–1997	70	13	83	18	
Richard Sneekes	Netherlands	MF	1994–1996	64	5	69	11	
Saša Ćurčić	Serbia	MF	1995–1996	33	0	33	7	
Steve McAnespie	Scotland	DF	1995–1997	25	5	30	0	
Gerry Taggart	Northern Ireland	DF	1995–1998	80	1	82	5	
Jamie Pollock	England	MF	1996–1998	51	4	55	8	
John Sheridan	Republic of Ireland	MF	1996–1998	28	8	36	2	
Gavin Ward	England	GK	1996–1999	25	3	28	0	
Neil Cox	England	DF	1997–1999	90	4	94	8	
Arnar Gunnlaugsson	Iceland	FW	1997–1999	31	22	53	15	
Steve Banks	England	GK	1998–2003	35	1	36	0	
Eiður Guðjohnsen	Iceland	FW	1998–2000; 2014–2015	78	19	97	33	
Bob Taylor	England	FW	1998–2000	70	26	96	27	
Gareth Farrelly	Republic of Ireland	MF	1999–2003	74	19	93	6	
John O'Kane	England	DF	1999–2001	39	7	46	3	
Franck Passi	France	MF	1999–2001	30	19	49	0	
Colin Hendry	Scotland	DF	2000–2003	33	0	33	3	
Ian Marshall	England	DF	2000–2002	18	27	45	6	
Youri Djorkaeff	France	MF	2002–2004	77	4	81	20	
Ricardo Vaz Tê	Portugal	FW	2003–2010	19	59	78	7	
Emerson Thome	Brazil	DF	2003–2004	31	1	32	0	
Radhi Jaïdi	Tunisia	DF	2004–2006	43	9	52	8	
Fernando Hierro	Spain	MF	2004–2005	21	14	35	1	
Joey O'Brien	Republic of Ireland	U	2005–2011	60	10	70	0	
Jared Borgetti	Mexico	FW	2005–2006	12	20	32	7	
Abdoulaye Faye	Senegal	DF	2005–2007	65	7	72	3	
Hidetoshi Nakata	Japan	MF	2005–2006	24	8	32	1	
Abdoulaye Méïté	Ivory Coast	DF	2006–2008	68	2	70	2	
Nicolas Anelka	France	FW	2006–2008	58	3	61	23	
Andranik Teymourian	Iran	MF	2006–2008	13	17	30	4	
Jlloyd Samuel	Trinidad and Tobago	DF	2007–2011	76	7	83	0	
Danny Guthrie	England	MF	2007–2008	30	5	35	1	
Tamir Cohen	Israel	MF	2007–2011	41	17	58	6	
Gavin McCann	England	MF	2007–2011	68	20	88	3	
Andy O'Brien	Republic of Ireland	DF	2007–2011	81	9	90	1	
Paul Robinson	England	DF	2009–2012	82	5	87	0	
Ivan Klasnić	Croatia	FW	2009–2012	44	50	94	24	
Stuart Holden	United States	MF	2010–2013	31	7	38	2	
Martin Petrov	Bulgaria	MF	2010–2013	66	19	85	11	
Nigel Reo-Coker	England	MF	2011–2012	42	0	42	3	
David Ngog	France	FW	2011–2014	63	28	91	16	
Marcos Alonso	Spain	DF	2010–2013	43	3	46	5	
Tyrone Mears	England	DF	2011–2014	30	2	32	0	
Keith Andrews	Republic of Ireland	MF	2012–2015	25	3	28	4	
Marvin Sordell	England	FW	2012–2014	16	13	29	8	
Matt Mills	England	DF	2012–2015	91	3	94	7	
Craig Davies	Wales	FW	2013–2015	27	31	58	11	
Mohamed Kamara	Sierra Leone	DF	2013–2016	46	11	57	3	
Andy Lonergan	England	GK	2012–2015	33	1	34	0	
Jermaine Beckford	Jamaica	FW	2013–2015	29	22	52	11	
André Moritz	Brazil	MF	2013–2014	8	19	27	7	
Robert Hall	England	FW	2013–2016	17	18	35	2	
Liam Feeney	England	MF	2013; 2014–2016	84	8	92	8	
Joe Mason	Republic of Ireland	FW	2013–2014; 2014	21	9	30	10	
Liam Trotter	England	MF	2014–2017	50	23	73	6	
Dorian Dervite	France	DF	2014–2018	92	7	99	2	
Dean Moxey	England	DF	2014–2017	72	10	82	2	
Emile Heskey	England	FW	2014–2016	27	21	48	3	
Ben Amos	England	GK	2015–2019	52	1	53	0	
Zach Clough	England	FW	2015–2017; 2018	58	19	77	23	
Wellington Silva	Brazil	MF	2015–2016	17	8	25	2	
Rob Holding	England	DF	2015–2016	30	0	30	1	
Stephen Dobbie	Scotland	FW	2015–2016	3	22	25	4	
Derik Osede	Spain	DF	2015–2018	59	12	71	2	
Lawrie Wilson	England	U	2015–2017	38	1	39	2	
Jamie Proctor	England	FW	2016–2017	12	17	29	1	
Andrew Taylor	England	DF	2016–2019	84	4	88	0	
James Henry	England	MF	2016–2017	16	19	35	2	
Max Clayton	England	FW	2014–2017	10	20	35	2	
Adam Le Fondre	England	FW	2015; 2017–2018	50	25	75	21	
Mark Howard	England	GK	2016–2018	37	2	39	0	
Tom Thorpe	England	DF	2016–2017	20	5	25	1	
Ben Alnwick	England	GK	2016–2019	94	1	95	0	
Filipe Morais	Portugal	MF	2017–2018	38	18	56	3	
Sammy Ameobi	England	MF	2016–2017; 2017–2019	78	13	91	12	
Mark Little	England	DF	2017–2019	33	2	35	1	
Antonee Robinson	United States	DF	2017–2018	30	4	34	0	
Reece Burke	England	DF	2017–2018	23	3	26	1	
Will Buckley	England	MF	2017–2020	43	23	66	6	
Aaron Wilbraham	England	FW	2017–2018	7	20	27	2	
Craig Noone	England	MF	2017–2019	34	31	65	2	
Karl Henry	England	MF	2017–2018	33	0	33	1	
Jack Hobbs	England	DF	2018–2020	37	2	39	2	
Jason Lowe	England	MF	2018–2020	70	1	71	0	
Josh Magennis	Northern Ireland	FW	2018–2019	31	14	45	7	
Clayton Donaldson	Jamaica	FW	2018–2019	19	15	34	2	
Joe Williams	England	MF	2018–2019	29	1	30	0	
Pawel Olkowski	Poland	DF	2018–2019	36	3	39	2	
Gary O'Neil	England	MF	2018–2019	25	6	31	3	
Remi Matthews	England	GK	2018–2020	58	0	58	0	
Luke Murphy	England	MF	2018–2020	38	7	45	2	
Dennis Politic	Romania	MF	2019–2022	23	7	30	5	
Josh Emmanuel	England	DF	2019–2020	29	2	31	0	
Daryl Murphy	Republic of Ireland	FW	2019–2020	25	1	26	8	
Joe Dodoo	Ghana	FW	2019–2020	18	9	27	4	
Ronan Darcy	England	MF	2019–2022	21	14	35	2	
Ali Crawford	Scotland	MF	2019–2022	32	4	36	3	
Ryan Delaney	Republic of Ireland	DF	2020–2021	25	2	27	3	
Harry Brockbank	England	DF	2019–2022	29	8	37	0	
Antoni Sarcevic	England	MF	2020–2021	46	6	52	11	
Nathan Delfouneso	England	FW	2020–2022	43	24	67	10	
Eoin Doyle	Republic of Ireland	FW	2020–2022	70	3	73	27	
Lloyd Isgrove	Wales	MF	2020–2023	42	22	64	3	
Matt Gilks	Scotland	GK	2020–2022	39	0	39	0	
Arthur Gnahoua	France	FW	2020–2021	7	23	30	3	
Kieran Lee	England	MF	2021–2023	70	21	91	11	
Declan John	Wales	DF	2021–2024	83	9	92	8	
Liam Gordon	Guyana	DF	2020–2022	24	12	36	0	
Elias Kachunga	DR Congo	FW	2021–2023	44	47	91	8	
Joel Dixon	England	GK	2021–2023	36	0	36	0	
Amadou Bakayoko	Sierra Leone	FW	2021–2023	24	40	64	17	
Will Aimson	England	DF	2021–2023	39	6	45	1	
James Trafford	England	GK	2022–2023	72	0	72	0	
Jón Daði Böðvarsson	Iceland	FW	2022–2024	41	53	94	25	
Kieran Sadlier	Republic of Ireland	U	2022–2023	16	30	46	9	
Conor Bradley	Northern Ireland	DF	2022–2023	48	5	53	7	
Jack Iredale	Australia	DF	2022–2024	56	13	69	3	
Randell Williams	England	U	2023–2025	54	27	81	6	
Victor Adeboyejo	Nigeria	FW	2023–2026	58	41	99	17	
Dan Nlundulu	England	FW	2023–2025	13	30	43	6	
Cameron Jerome	England	FW	2023–2024	6	49	55	4	
Nathan Baxter	England	GK	2023–2025	70	1	71	0	
Paris Maghoma	England	MF	2023–2024	39	11	50	9	
Aaron Collins	Wales	FW	2024–2025	59	18	77	28	
Will Forrester	England	DF	2023–2026	43	10	53	1	
Jay Matete	England	MF	2024–2025	27	18	45	3	
John McAtee	England	FW	2024–	52	42	94	16	
Szabolcs Schön	Hungary	U	2024–2026	36	8	44	1	
Carlos Mendes Gomes	Guinea-Bissau	U	2023–2026	11	25	36	4	
Jordi Osei-Tutu	England	U	2024–2026	54	26	80	6	
Klaidi Lolos	Greece	U	2024–2025	14	16	30	3	
Luke Southwood	Northern Ireland	GK	2024–2025	26	0	26	0	
Joel Randall	England	MF	2025–	21	18	39	2	
Chris Forino-Joseph	Saint Lucia	DF	2024–	58	8	66	3	
Max Conway	England	DF	2025–	47	17	64	0	
Mason Burstow	England	FW	2025–2026	32	21	53	12	
Amario Cozier-Duberry	England	FW	2025–2026	35	6	41	10	
Sam Dalby	England	FW	2025–	45	23	68	21	
Xavier Simons	England	MF	2025–	35	14	49	3	
Marcus Forss	Finland	FW	2025–2026	13	12	25	5	
Ethan Erhahon	Scotland	MF	2025–	35	13	48	1	
Thierry Gale	Barbados	FW	2025–	37	22	59	10	
Ibrahim Cissoko	Guinea	FW	2025–2026	16	18	34	6	
Cyrus Christie	Republic of Ireland	DF	2025–2026	17	13	30	0	
Jack Bonham	Republic of Ireland	GK	2026–	33	0	33	0	
Rúben Rodrigues	Portugal	MF	2026–	17	12	29	6	

== Notes ==
- A utility player is one who is considered to play in more than one position.
