= Ransomes =

Ransomes is the common name for the Ransomes, Sims & Jefferies an engineering business of Orwell Works, Ipswich.
It may also refer to several other associated organisations or locations:

- Ransome & Marles, Newark-on-Trent and their brass band
- Ransomes & Rapier of Waterside Works, Ipswich
- Ransomes and Reavell Sports Club Ground, Ipswich
- Ransomes Industrial Estate, Ipswich
- Ransomes, Sims & Jefferies, an engineering business of Orwell Works, Ipswich
- Ransomes Sports F.C., Ransomes and Reavell Sports Club Ground, Ipswich

Former names for the business of Ransomes, Sims and Jefferies include:

(partnerships)

- 1789 Robert Ransome.
- 1809 Ransome & Son.
- 1818 Ransome & Sons.
- 1823 J & R Ransome.
- 1830 J R and A Ransome.
- 1846 Ransomes & May. added Charles May
- 1852 Ransomes & Sims. added William Dillwyn Sims
- 1869 Ransomes, Sims & Head. added John Head
- 1881 Ransomes, Sims & Jefferies. added John Robert Jefferies

(Incorporated limited liability joint-stock company)

- 1884 Ransomes, Sims & Jefferies Limited
- 1911 Public listed company Ransomes, Sims & Jefferies Limited
