= Tom Miller =

Tom Miller may refer to:

== Arts and entertainment ==
- Tom Miller (broadcaster) (1940–1993), American radio personality and emcee
- Tom Miller (artist) (1945–2000), American artist
- Tom Miller (travel writer) (born 1947), travel writer from Tucson
- Tom Miller (performance artist) (born 1965), American writer and performance artist
- Tom Miller (musician) (born 1976), American musician and co-creator of Black Camaro

== Sports ==
=== Association football ===
- Tom Miller (footballer, born 1890) (1890–1958), Scottish footballer and top league scorer for Liverpool F.C. in 1914
- Tom Miller (footballer, born 1990), English professional footballer
- Tom Miller (1890s footballer), English professional footballer
- Tommy Miller (born 1979), English footballer

=== Other sports ===
- Tom Miller (catcher) (1850–1876), American baseball player
- Tom Miller (pinch hitter) (1897–1980), American baseball player
- Tom Miller (American football) (1918–2005), American football player and executive
- Tom Miller (Australian footballer) (born 1928), Australian rules footballer
- Tom Miller (ice hockey) (1947–2017), Kitchener Ranger who played in the NHL
- Tom Miller (basketball) (born 1948), American basketball coach

== Others ==
- Tom Miller (saloon keeper), who built a saloon in Deadwood, South Dakota in 1876
- Tom Miller (politician) (born 1944), state Attorney General of Iowa
- Tom Miller (computer programmer) (born 1950), Microsoft employee
- Tom Miller (author and historian) creator of "Daytonian in Manhattan" on-line blog; describer of New York City architecture and related human interest stories

== See also ==
- Tom Miller a character from Heroes (TV series)
- Thomas Miller (disambiguation)
- Robert Thomas Miller (died 1962), mayor of Austin, Texas
