= RSFC =

RSFC may refer to:

- Ransomes Sports F.C.
- Rayon Sports F.C.
- Resting state functional connectivity, see Resting state fMRI
- Rochdale Sixth Form College
