= Jacobbi Tugman =

Cayman Islands footballer

Personal information
- Full name: Jacobbi Aleksei Tugman
- Date of birth: 3 October 2004 (age 22)
- Place of birth: Bodden Town, Cayman Islands
- Position: Forward

Team information
- Current team: SV Hemelingen

Youth career
- 2016–2021: Academy SC

Senior career*
Years	Team	Apps	(Gls)
2021–2022	Leiston	4	(1)
2022–2023	Capel Plough	1	(0)
2023–2024	CSM Alexandria	0	(0)
2024–2025	Newington	8	(0)
2025–	SV Hemelingen	2	(0)

International career^{‡}
2024–	Cayman Islands	8	(0)
- * Club domestic league appearances and goals as of 12:24, 5 September 2025 (UTC) ‡ National team caps and goals as of 12:24, 5 September 2025 (UTC)

Jacobbi Tugman (born 3 October 2004) is a Cayman Islands association footballer who plays for German Bremen-Liga club SV Hemelingen and the Cayman Islands national team.

== Youth career ==
Tugman was a standout in the Cayman Islands youth football system. He competed in the CUC Primary Football League for Bodden Town Primary and was a regular scorer in the competition. The team reached the cup final in 2014. The following season he was his team's top goalscorer.

In 2014 at age nine, Tugman was invited to a two-week trial with Ipswich Town F.C. after he was spotted by head coach Steve Foley during a visit to the islands. After a successful trial in August 2014, he was invited back for further testing. He returned in August 2015 and scored against an academy side of Tottenham Hotspur.

By 2016 Tugman had joined the academy of Cayman Islands Premier League club Academy SC. That season Tugman was the lead scorer in a seven-a-side tournament hosted by the club. The following season the club went undefeated en route to winning the U13 Cayman Islands FA Cup. Tugman scored two goals in the eventual 4–0 victory over Sunset FC in the final.

In summer 2017 Tugman returned to England again for a trial period with Barnet FC and another stint with Ipswich Town.

== Club career ==
By 2021 Tugman had joined Leiston F.C. of the Southern League Premier Division. He was part of both the reserve and senior sides. In 2022 the club advanced to the final of the Suffolk Premier Cup before ultimately falling to Ipswich Wanderers F.C. 0–1 with Tugman in the squad. Following his departure from Leiston in 2022, Tugman joined his brother Joshua at Capel Plough of the Suffolk and Ipswich Football League. He made one first-team appearance during the season.

In February 2023, Tugman went on trial with CSM Alexandria of Romania's Liga III. During a training match against CS Tunari, he seriously injured a Tunari player which resulted in the match being abandoned and the player requiring surgery to repair tibia and fibula fractures. When the league resumed the following month, Tugman was part of the league roster but missed the first match against ACS Flacăra Horezu through injury. That season the club won promotion to Liga II for the 2023–24 season. On 30 August 2023 Tugman made his competitive senior debut for the club in a 2023–24 Cupa României match against CS Concordia Chiajna. He started the match and played the first forty-five minutes of the eventual 1–0 victory. In the next round, Tugman assisted on a goal by Adrian Gîdea to help earn an upset victory over Liga I club FC Botoșani on 2 November 2023. As of October 2023, Tugman had not appeared in a league match for the club, but continued to appear in cup and friendly matches.

On 9 August 2024, it was announced that Tugman had joined Newington F.C. of Northern Ireland's NIFL Championship. The following summer he moved to SV Hemelingen of the Bremen-Liga, the fifth tier of the German football league system. Soon thereafter, he helped the club win the annual ALTS Cup, defeating Brinkumer SV in the final.

== International career ==
Tugman received his first call-up to the Cayman Islands national team in March 2023 for a 2022–23 CONCACAF Nations League C match away to Puerto Rico. He was an unused substitute in the match. Later that year, he and the other Caymanian player at clubs abroad had missed matches with the national team because of their distance.

Tugman made his senior debut on 8 June 2023 in a 1–0 victory over Antigua and Barbuda in 2026 FIFA World Cup qualification. The victory was the Cayman team's first-ever win in World Cup qualification. Early in the second half of the match, Tugman took a shot that hit the crossbar for a near goal.

=== International career statistics ===
As of match played 7 June 2025.

Cayman Islands national team
2024	7	0
2025	1	0
Total	8	0
