= Ostick =

Ostick is a surname. Notable people with the surname include:

- Charlie Ostick (1875–1954), English footballer
- Michael Ostick (born 1988), English rugby league player
