= Sir Thomas Miller, 1st Baronet =

Sir Thomas Miller, 1st Baronet may refer to:

- Sir Thomas Miller, 1st Baronet of Chichester (c. 1635–1705), MP for Chichester 1689–1695
- Thomas Miller, Lord Glenlee (1717–1789), 1st Baronet of Glenlee, Scottish politician and judge, Member of Parliament 1761–66

== See also ==
- Thomas Miller (disambiguation)
