= Capel Plough F.C. =

English football club

- Full name: Capel Plough Football Club
- Founded: 1969
- Ground: Capel St. Mary's Playing Field
- Capacity: 500
- Chairman: Gareth Millar
- Manager: Arron Hall
- League: Suffolk & Ipswich League Championship
- 2025–26: Suffolk & Ipswich League Championship, 9th of 13
- Website: capelploughfc.co.uk

Capel Plough F.C. is an English association football club based in Capel St. Mary, Suffolk currently competing in the Suffolk & Ipswich League Championship. The club is one of the fastest growing clubs in the county. Since May 2023 it has been an official affiliate of Ipswich Town FC and is an FA Charter Standard club.

== Facilities ==
The club plays its home matches at the Capel St. Mary's Playing Field. The club's pavilion was built in the early 1970s and underwent a significant reconstruction beginning in 2021. The previous year, the Babergh District Council approved plans to demolish the center to construct a new, modern sports and social hub which would have included a new 3G artificial turf football pitch. As of May 2023, there are still plans to install the modern turf pitch at the grounds.

== History ==
Capel Plough F.C. was founded in 1969. In May 2023, it was announced that the club had become an official affiliate of Ipswich Town FC. The partnership would see Capel Plough players participating in the Ipswich Town academy system as a possible pathway to the senior club. Capel Plough had already been working together on different initiatives with the Ipswich Town Foundation for a number of years.

=== Male ===
The club's senior team began the 2018/2019 season with six consecutive victories in the Suffolk and Ipswich Football League. Those victories included a 5–2 win over title holders Achilles F.C. thanks to a hat-trick by Daniel Alderson. In late 2021, the club entered into a partnership with the academy of Needham Market. As part of the agreement, Needham Market academy coach Arron Hall took over as the manager of Capel Plough's men's first team, replacing outgoing manager Pat Tynan. The deal would give Capel Plough access to some of the best facilities in Suffolk.

=== Female ===
In 2016, Capel Plough organized female teams for the first time. Soon thereafter a girls side was runners-up in the Suffolk FA Cup and third in the Suffolk League. In 2017, the club hosted nearby Colchester United F.C. players Eoin McKeown and Ryan Clampin as part of a training for its girls teams. In 2018, the club opened a new Wildcat Centre in Capel St. Mary along with MP James Cartlidge. The facility was designed specifically for young female players between the ages of five and eleven. The following year, Adrian Goodwin, the central figure in creating the women and girls' football program at Capel Plough, was headhunted to become first-ever Director of Women's and Girls' Football for A.F.C. Sudbury. Goodwin was brought in to recreate the structures and success of Capel Plough and have a Sudbury women's team at every level in Suffolk. The club formed a senior women's team for the first time in 2023. In its first year of existence, the club was defeated 2–3 in the first round of the Suffolk Women's County Cup by Brantham Athletic Ladies Development.

== Notable former players ==
- (Cayman Islands) Jacobbi Tugman (2022–2023)
