= Thomas Miller =

Thomas Miller may refer to:

== Politicians ==
- Thomas Miller (North Carolina governor) (died 1685), governor in 1677
- Thomas Miller, Lord Glenlee (1717–1789), Scottish politician and judge, member of parliament 1761–1766
- Thomas B. Miller (1896–1976), U.S. representative from Pennsylvania
- Thomas E. Miller (1849–1938), U.S. representative from South Carolina
- Thomas H. Miller (Iowa newspaperman) (1925–2001), Iowa politician and newspaper editor
- Thomas Miller (Saskatchewan) (1876–1945), lieutenant-governor of Saskatchewan in 1945
- Thomas W. Miller (1886–1973), U.S. representative from Delaware
- Thomas John Miller (born 1944), state attorney general of Iowa
- Thomas V. Miller Jr. (1942–2021), president of the Maryland State Senate
- Thomas J. Miller (diplomat) (born 1948), former U.S. ambassador to Greece
- Sir Thomas Miller, 1st Baronet, of Chichester (1635–1705), MP for Chichester 1689–1695
- Sir Thomas Miller, 3rd Baronet (c. 1689–1733), MP for Chichester 1715–1727
- Sir Thomas Miller, 5th Baronet (1731–1816), MP for Lewes 1774–1778 and Portsmouth 1806–1816
- Thomas Miller (Wyoming politician) (1898–1993), American attorney and politician, member of the Wyoming Senate

== Sports ==
- Thomas Miller (cricketer) (1883–1962), English cricketer
- Tommy Miller (footballer, born 1882) (1882–1932), Scottish footballer
- Thomas Miller (Scottish footballer) (1907–1974), Scottish footballer
- Thomas Miller (Queen's Park footballer), Scottish footballer
- Thomas Miller (Rangers footballer), Scottish footballer
- Tommy Miller (speedway rider) (1924–1975), Scottish speedway rider
- Thomas Miller (footballer, born 1963), German footballer
- Tommy Miller (born 1979), English footballer

== Others ==
- Thomas Miller (bookseller) (1731–1804), English bookseller
- Thomas Miller (poet) (1807–1874), English poet and novelist
- Thomas Miller (pastor) (born 1970), leader of Gateway Worship
- Thomas Miller (visual artist) (1920–2012), creator of the founders' mosaics at the DuSable Museum, Chicago
- Thomas Miller (bassist), bassist of Symphony X
- Thomas H. Miller (1923–2007), United States Marine Corps naval aviator and test pilot
- Sir Thomas Miller, 6th Baronet (1781–1864), Church of England clergyman
- Thomas G. Miller, Commander United States First Army
- Thomas Francis Miller (1863–1939), American architect
- Thomas I. Miller, American academic administrator and accountant
- Thomas Maskew Miller (1863–1926), South African bookseller and publisher
- Thomas Fredrick Dawson Miller (1867–1931), British judge and barrister in India
- Tommy Miller, a character in the film Ah, Wilderness!
- Tommy Miller, a character in the video game The Last of Us and the TV series

== See also ==
- Tom Miller (disambiguation)
- Thomas Millar (1925–1994), Australian historian and political scientist
