= Liam Trotter =

English footballer

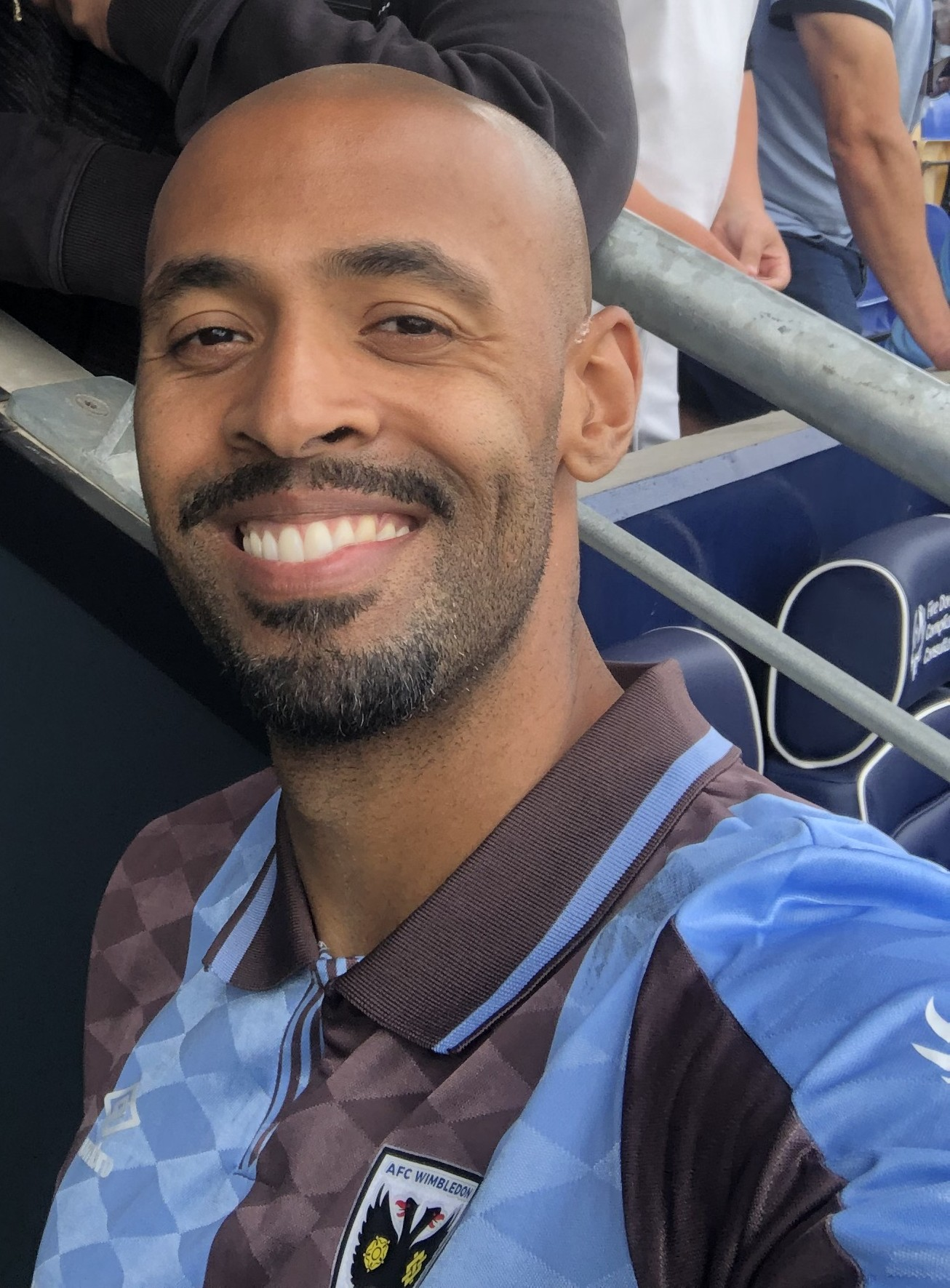
- Trotter in 2025.

Personal information
- Full name: Liam Antony Trotter
- Date of birth: 24 August 1988 (age 38)
- Place of birth: Ipswich, England
- Height: 6 ft 4 in (1.93 m)
- Position: Midfielder

Youth career
- Witnesham Wasps
- Ransomes Sports
- Achilles
- Bury Town
- Woodbridge Town
- –2006: Ipswich Town

Senior career*
Years	Team	Apps	(Gls)
2006–2010	Ipswich Town	22	(2)
2006	→ Millwall (loan)	2	(0)
2008	→ Grimsby Town (loan)	15	(2)
2009	→ Scunthorpe United (loan)	13	(1)
2010	→ Millwall (loan)	23	(1)
2010–2014	Millwall	125	(22)
2014	→ Bolton Wanderers (loan)	16	(1)
2014–2017	Bolton Wanderers	47	(4)
2015–2016	→ Nottingham Forest (loan)	9	(1)
2017–2019	AFC Wimbledon	61	(4)
2019	Orange County SC	16	(0)
2020–2022	Bromley	65	(2)
2022–2023	Chelmsford City	38	(3)
Total		452	(41)
- * Club domestic league appearances and goals as of 17:50, 3 May 2023 (UTC)

Liam Antony Trotter (born 24 August 1988) is an English former professional footballer who played as a midfielder for Ipswich Town, Grimsby Town, Scunthorpe United, Millwall, Bolton Wanderers, Nottingham Forest, AFC Wimbledon, Orange County SC, Bromley, and Chelmsford City.

== Club career ==
=== Ipswich Town ===
Trotter started out in the Felixstowe and District youth league, where he played for numerous clubs (including Witnesham Wasps, Ransomes Sports, Achilles, Bury Town F.C., and Woodbridge) before being scouted for Ipswich Town and signed for the side at sixteen years old. Trotter was one of the players to appear in the FA Youth Cup victory in 2005, where they beat Southampton 3–2 over two legs. His progress in the club's academy earned a first team call-up on two occasions throughout the 2005–06 season.

He made his league debut in Joe Royle's last game in charge against Plymouth Argyle, at Home Park on 30 April 2006, coming on for Ian Westlake with ten minutes to go. He signed his first professional contract with Ipswich Town on 30 August 2006. Since returning from the loan at Millwall, Trotter made his first appearance of the 2006–07 season, coming on as a substitute in the 80th minute for Jaime Peters in the 1–0 FA Cup Fifth Round defeat at Watford, on 17 February 2007. Following this, Trotter spent the rest of the 2006–07 season, playing for the reserve side.

In the 2007–08 season, Trotter was expected to be loaned out to gain first team experience. But he stayed at Ipswich Town instead throughout the summer. He made his second league appearance against Colchester at Portman Road on 24 October 2007, coming on for Billy Clarke, with the score at 1–1. He then went on to score, as Ipswich Town won 3–1. After the match, he said: "It was a dream home debut for me. I was hoping before the game that I could come on and score and it was amazing." However, in his first start of the season against Sheffield United on 6 November 2007, Trotter gave away a penalty, which saw the side lost 3–1. Following this, Trotter found himself out of the first team and continued to play for the club's reserve side throughout the 2007–08 season. He also faced with his own injury concern. Despite this, Trotter was featured in the FA Cup match against Portsmouth but was sent–off for a professional foul on Pedro Mendes, in a 1–0 loss. As a result, he served a three match suspension for the side. On 26 February 2008, Trotter then signed a one–year contract extension with the club, keeping him until 2009. At the end of the 2007–08 season, he went on to make seven appearances and scoring once for the side.

Trotter scored his second goal for Ipswich against Burnley in the second league game of the 2008–09 season-the first in a 3–0 win. For his performance, he was named Championship Team of the Week. However, Trotter soon lost his first team place to Alan Quinn. He then made four more appearances for the side by the time he was loaned out, which three of them were starts.

In the 2009–10 season, Trotter was back in the first team under the new manager of Roy Keane and expected to fight for his first team place in the club's midfield competition. After impressing in the pre–season, Trotter was given a first team return and started the whole game, in a 2–1 loss against Coventry City in the opening game of the season. Since returning to the first team, he then established himself in the starting eleven for the side, playing in the midfield position. However, following Ipswich Town's winning form at the start of November, Trotter was dropped from the first team by Manager Keane. It came after when his performance was subjected of criticism by local newspaper, Ipswich Star, in a number of matches. By the time he was loaned out, Trotter made twelve appearances for the side in the 2009–10 season. At the end of the season, he was offered a new contract by the club.

==== Grimsby Town (loan) ====
Trotter signed on loan for Grimsby Town on 18 September 2008, with Grimsby caretaker manager Stuart Watkiss bringing Trotter to the club for an initial month, which was extended to a three-month stay as the loan progressed. He made his debut on 19 September 2008 against Morecambe, starting the match before being substituted in the 63rd minute, as they drew 1–1. Trotter then scored his first goal for the club on 24 October 2008, in a 3–1 loss against Bradford City. After holding down a place in the first team, Trotter helped Grimsby by scoring in the club's 2–0 win over Bury, which was Grimsby's first league win of the 2008–09 campaign. He settled down as well under new Grimsby boss Mike Newell and was regularly played in the centre of midfield along with Jean-Paul Kamudimba Kalala. He returned to Ipswich on 22 December after playing his final game for the Mariners against Aldershot Town two days previously.

==== Scunthorpe United (loan) ====
On 5 February 2009, Trotter joined Scunthorpe United on trial with a view to a loan deal. The loan was confirmed on 23 February. Trotter made his debut for the Iron the following day, coming on as sub for Sam Togwell in the defeat at Southend United. Despite being restricted to the substitute bench, he continued to remain in the first team and had his loan spell with Scunthorpe United extended until the end of the season. His first goal for the Iron came against Northampton Town a header from a corner, as they drew 3–3 on 21 April 2009. He made the bench for the first leg of the League One play-off semi-final, against Milton Keynes Dons, he did not however make an appearance, he played all of the match and extra time however at stadium:MK in the second leg, scoring a penalty in the shootout which Scunthorpe won 7–6. Trotter played at Wembley when he came on as a substitute for Sam Togwell in the 55th minute, as the "Iron" defeated Millwall 3–2 in the play-off final. In the summer transfer window following this, he was subject to a bid from Scunthorpe but chose to stay with Ipswich Town signing a new one-year contract.

==== Millwall (loan) ====
Just days after signing his first professional contract for Ipswich Town, Trotter immediately moved to Millwall on a three-month loan deal until December 2006 to gain first team experience. He made his Millwall debut, coming on as a substitute for Neal Ardley in the 73rd minute, in a 0–0 draw against Blackpool on 2 September 2006 Whilst with Millwall, Trotter made two league appearances, but scored in neither.

On 5 January 2010, he re-joined Millwall for a second loan period on an initial month deal. Trotter scored his first Millwall in his second Millwall debut, as they drew 1–1 with Southampton on 16 January 2010. His performance at the club saw his loan spell extended until the end of the season. Trotter started every match for the side until he suffered an injury during a 1–1 draw against Yeovil Town on 13 April 2010. This led local newspaper Ipswich Star to bring up the curse of the Ipswich Town's players, who suffered an injury whilst on loan. It was not until 1 May 2010 when Trotter returned from injury, starting the whole game, in a 1–0 loss against Tranmere Rovers. He later helped play a big part in earning Millwall promotion later in the 2009–10 season. Trotter started the match in the play-off final, as Millwall beat Swindon Town 1–0 to send Millwall promoted to the Championship. At the end of the 2009–10 season, he went on to make twenty appearances and scoring once for the side in all competitions.

=== Millwall (permanent move) ===
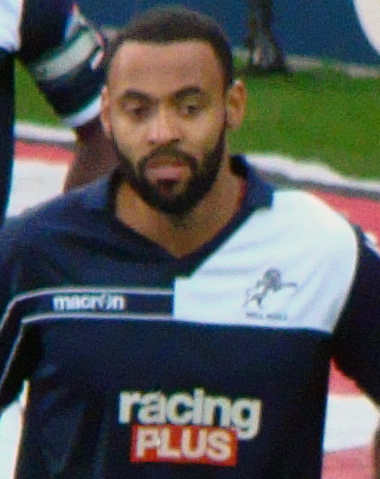
Trotter playing for Millwall in 2012

On 24 June 2010, Trotter officially signed his two-year contract with Millwall, after initially being at the club for his second loan spell.

Trotter's first game after signing for the club on a permanent basis came in the opening game of the season, starting the whole game, in a 3–0 win over Bristol City. In a follow-up match against Hull City, he scored his first goal since joining the club permanently, in a 4–0 win. Trotter added two more goals for the side later in August, scoring against Middlesbrough in the League Cup and Coventry. After missing out two matches due to injury, he scored on his return, in a 6–1 loss against Watford on 18 September 2010. However, his return was short–lived when he was sent off for a high studs on Darcy Blake, as Millwall lost 2–1 against Cardiff City in a follow–up match. Following the match, Manager Kenny Jackett said: "I don't want to comment on the referee's performance – it will get me into trouble. Liam feels dejected at the moment and that he's let us down. But I feel he's been harshly treated. I haven't seen any malice in him whatsoever." After serving a three match suspension, Trotter returned to the starting line-up on 19 October 2010, coming on as a second–half substitute, in a 1–0 loss against Portsmouth. Two months later on 26 December 2010, he started against Portsmouth for the second time this season and scored his fifth goal of the season, in a 1–1 draw. Trotter later three more goals later in the season, scoring against Queens Park Rangers, Cardiff City and Leeds United. Despite suffering from injuries during the 2010–11 season, he remained in the first team for the side throughout the season. Trotter made thirty–eight appearances and scored eight goals in Millwall's return to the Championship.

At the start of the 2011–12 season, Trotter started the season well when he set up the club's first goal in a 2–2 draw against Reading in the opening game of the season. In the next two matches, Trotter scored two goals against Nottingham Forest and Peterborough United. His performance saw him being linked to clubs, such as, Reading, Everton and Bolton Wanderers but he stayed at the club throughout summer. Trotter continued to establish himself in the starting eleven for the side, playing in the midfield position. His third goal of the season came on 15 October 2011 came in a 1–1 draw against Middlesbrough. Two weeks later on 1 November 2011, Trotter provided a hat–trick assists, including two goals from Darius Henderson, in a 3–0 win over Coventry City. Three weeks later on 29 November 2011, he scored a brace, in a 3–2 win against Doncaster Rovers at home. Trotter then captained the side for the first time in his Millwall career and set up a goal for Darius Henderson, who scored a hat–trick, in a 3–0 win over Barnsley on 21 January 2012. Trotter captained the next three matches and scored two goals, including one in the major rivalry between Millwall and West Ham United at The Boleyn Ground. He also scored a goal at Portman Road against his former club Ipswich Town on 21 April 2012. Following the match, he was named Championship team of the week. Despite many injuries, Trotter finished the 2011–12 season, Trotter went on to make forty appearances and scoring eight times in all competitions; following this, the club began talks with Abdou over a new contract.

Ahead of the 2012–13 season, Trotter was linked with a move to newly promoted Premier League side Southampton and Stoke City. But Manager Kenny Jackett was determined to keep him at Millwall, which he did throughout the summer, and Trotter, himself, was keen to stay. At the start of the 2012–13 season, Trotter was given the captaincy in the absence of Danny Shittu and captained the side until November when Shittu returned from the sideline. He then scored his first goal of the season, in a 3–2 loss against Sheffield Wednesday on 25 August 2012, followed up by scoring against Middlesbrough, in a 3–1 win. Trotter then scored his third goal of the season, as well as, setting up one of the goal, in a 2–2 draw against Burnley on 29 September 2012. Three weeks later on 20 October 2012, he scored his fourth goal of the season against local rivals, Crystal Palace, in a 2–2 draw. Trotter then scored two goals in two matches once again this season between 27 October 2012 and 3 November 2012 against Huddersfield Town and Nottingham Forest. He continued to establish himself in the starting eleven for the side, playing in the midfield position and performed impressively since the start of the 2012–13 season. Trotter started in every match until he suffered an injury that saw him miss three matches in late–November. On 8 December 2012 Trotter returned to the starting line-up, in a 3–0 loss against Ipswich Town. In a follow–up match against Leicester City, he set up a goal for Chris Taylor, to score the only goal in the game. However, in late–February, he was dropped from the starting line-up for two matches by Manager Kenny Jackett, leading to speculation that the pair fallen out, which he dismissed the claim. Trotter returned to the first team, coming on as a substitute for Josh Wright in the 74th minute, in a 2–0 loss against Wolverhampton Wanderers on 5 March 2013. He then suffered a knee injury that kept him out for five matches at the beginning of April. On 30 April 2013 he returned as a late substitute in a 0–0 draw against local rivals, Crystal Palace. By the end of the 2012–13 season, Trotter made 46 appearances and scored six times in all competitions.

Ahead of the 2013–14 season, Manager Steve Lomas was determined to keep Trotter, having been linked a move away from the club. However, at the start of the 2013–14 season, Trotter suffered a knee injury that kept him out for six to eight weeks. On 31 August 2013 he returned from injury, coming on as a late substitute, in a 1–1 draw against Brighton & Hove Albion. On 17 September 2013 Trotter scored his first goal of the season, in a 3–1 win over Blackpool. He later scored two more goals for the side, scoring against AFC Bournemouth and Reading. Since returning from injury, he continued to establish himself in the starting eleven for the side, playing in the midfield position. For his performance, Trotter was in talk with the club over a new contract. Amid to a contract talk, he then suffered a groin injury that kept him out for two matches. Trotter then returned from injury, starting the whole game, in a 2–2 draw against Nottingham Forest on 3 December 2013; which after the match, Manager Steve Lomas praised his performance. Trotter, again, was sidelined with a knee injury, which he sustained during a 4–0 heavy defeat against Watford and missed two matches. By the time Trotter departed on loan for Bolton Wanderers, he made nineteen appearances and scoring three times for the side.

=== Bolton Wanderers ===
On 31 January 2014, Trotter joined Bolton Wanderers on loan for the remainder of the season. It came after when Manager Dougie Freedman made an approach to sign him.

Trotter made his Bolton Wanderers debut on 1 February 2014, coming on as a late substitute, in a 1–0 loss against Ipswich Town. Since joining the club, he soon received much playing time, appearing in the first team in a number of matches. Manager Freedman commented about his performance, saying: "Liam showed me he can handle that position – and you only have to see the power he showed to get through them before he got brought down just after half time. That's how it's gone for us. It has taken Liam a couple of months to get up to speed and how we want to train – but I think we've seen a glimpse of how they are going to be." Trotter then scored his first goal for the club, in a 3–1 win over Sheffield Wednesday on 26 April 2014. His goal was voted the club's Goal of the Month for April and eventually the club's Goal of the Season. However, his arrival at Bolton Wanderers was met with scepticism among supporters. At the end of the 2013–14 season, having made sixteen appearances and scoring once for the side, on 12 May 2014, Bolton Wanderers confirmed that Trotter would join them on a three-year contract on 1 July after a successful loan spell at the end of the 2013–14 season.

At the start of the 2014–15 season, Trotter appeared five times before suffering a hamstring injury that saw him sidelined for ten weeks. After returning to training, on 31 October 2014 he came on as a second–half sub in a 2–1 loss against Norwich City. Since returning to the first team, Trotter spent the next six matches out of the starting eleven. He scored his first Bolton goal as an official Bolton player in a 4–2 loss to Rotherham United on 27 January 2015. However, Trotter suffered a thigh injury and had to be substituted at half time during a 4–1 loss against Derby County on 7 February 2015. He didn't make his return until on 14 March 2015, coming on as a late substitute, in a 2–0 win over Millwall. Trotter then started the next two matches, playing in the defensive midfield position. Following this, he was never played for the rest of the season. At the end of the 2014–15 season, Trotter went on to make eighteen appearances and scoring once in all competitions.

In the 2015–16 season, Trotter made one appearance for the side in the opening game of the season against Derby County before suffering a hamstring injury shortly after. Shortly after, he was placed available on loan, as his first team opportunities was limited under the management of Neil Lennon. After returning from a loan spell at Nottingham Forest, he returned to the club's first team, coming on as a late substitute, in a 1–1 draw against Eastleigh in third round of the FA Cup on 9 January 2016. Trotter started against Eastleigh in the third round replay of the FA Cup and helped them beat Eastleigh 3–2 to progress to the next round. Since returning to the first team, he regained his first team place for the side, playing in the midfield position. His return to the first team had convinced Manager Lennon that he was wrong to leave out Trotter. However, he suffered a hamstring injury during a 2–1 win over Rotherham United on 6 February 2016 and had to be substituted. On 5 March 2016 Trotter returned to the starting line-up, coming on as a substitute in the 68th minute, in a 2–1 loss against Leeds United. He then scored his first goal of the season, in a 2–1 loss against Preston North End, seven days later on 12 March 2016. After the match, Trotter said about the club's recent situation, saying: " We think about the fans because they pay a lot of money to watch us. They have put their cash into this club over the years and no-one knows where it has gone. The club is in a bad financial state. They have the most right to be upset because their money has been misused. Of course we feel for them. They have been very understanding and have supported us through every single game. Since I have been back, this was probably the first time we've been booed. It is a credit to them. This isn't for us, we need to keep going for them." Following a 3–1 loss against Brentford on 6 April 2016, Trotter caused controversy along with David Wheater when they made "an abusive finger gesture" on camera; which he apologised afterwards. As a result, the pair was disciplined by the club. Shortly after, Bolton Wanderers was relegated to League One after losing 4–1 to Derby County on 9 April 2016. Soon after, Trotter was dropped from the first team and never played again for the rest of the season. At the end of the 2015–16 season, Trotter went on to make sixteen appearances and scoring once for the season.

Trotter started the 2016–17 season well when he scored his first goal of the season, in a 2–1 win over AFC Wimbledon on 13 August 2016. Trotter then continued to establish himself in the starting eleven for the side, playing in the midfield position. Trotter started every match since the start of the season until he was placed at the substitute bench at the beginning of October. After returning to the starting line-up against Port Vale on 29 October 2016, he scored his second goal of the season, in a 1–0 win over Grimsby Town in the third round of the FA Cup. But Trotter suffered an injury and suspended for picking up his fifth booking this season. After missing seven matches, he made his return to the first team on 2 January 2017, in a 2–2 draw against Coventry City. During the match, Trotter was substituted in the 59th minute, lead the club's supporters to cheer sarcastically. His second goal for the club then came on 11 February 2017, in a 4–1 win over Walsall. However, by mid–March, he was dropped from the starting line–up and never played for the team again. Despite this, Trotter was part of the team that saw Bolton Wanderers promoted to the Championship after spending one season at League One.

On 11 May 2017, the club confirmed that Trotter would be leaving at the end of his contract on 30 June.

==== Nottingham Forest (loan) ====
On 24 October 2015, Trotter joined Championship rivals' Nottingham Forest initially on a one-month loan to get regular first team football. Three days before joining Nottingham Forest, he was expected to join the club but the move fell through because of a "technical issue".

Trotter made his full debut for Forest on the day he joined The Reds against Ipswich Town and scored near the end of the match on his debut, as Nottingham Forest drew 1–1 all at the City Ground. He quickly became a first team regular for the side, establishing himself in the midfield position throughout his time there. His performance saw him get his loan spell at Nottingham Forest extended until January. Having made nine appearances and scoring once for the side, Trotter returned to his parent club in January.

=== AFC Wimbledon ===
On 21 July 2017, Trotter joined AFC Wimbledon on an undisclosed-length contract. He revealed that many clubs were interested in signing him before he chose to join AFC Wimbledon.

Trotter made his debut for AFC Wimbledon in a 1–1 draw at Scunthorpe United on 5 August 2017 in the opening game of the season. However, he soon suffered a knee injury that saw him miss two matches. Trotter then made his return from injury, coming on as a substitute in the 71st minute, in a 2–1 loss against Fleetwood Town on 19 August 2017. Since returning to the first team, he established himself in the starting eleven for the side. His number of appearances for the side earned him praise by Manager Neal Ardley throughout the season. He scored his first goal for the club on 1 January 2018 against Southend United. Two weeks later on 20 January 2018, Trotter scored again and set up the second goal in the game, in a 2–0 win over Blackpool. He scored his third goal two weeks later on 6 February 2018, in a 2–1 loss against Bury. However, Trotter suffered a knock that saw him sidelined for the rest of the season. Despite this, Trotter went on to make forty–five appearances and scoring three times in his first season at Wimbledon.

Ahead of the 2018–19 season, Trotter was appointed as the club's vice–captain, with Deji Oshilaja appointed as captain. He then continued to regain his first team for the side at the start of the season, playing in the midfield position. In the absence of Oshilaja, Trotter captained the side for the first time, starting the whole game, as AFC Wimbledon lost 2–1 against Walsall on 21 August 2018. On 15 September 2018 he scored his first goal of the season, in a 3–2 loss against Scunthorpe United, which was followed up by setting up the club's only goal in the game, in a 2–1 loss against Accrington Stanley. Trotter was at fault when he missed a penalty, which would have seen AFC Wimbledon equalise, as the side lost 1–0 against Peterborough United on 30 November 2018. However, by December, Trotter soon found his first team opportunities limited under the management of Wally Downes, Ardley's successor. By the time he departed Wimbledon in February, Trotter made 25 appearances, scoring once in all competitions.

=== Orange County SC ===
On 19 February 2019, Wimbledon and Trotter mutually agreed to terminate his contract so he could sign for USL Championship side Orange County SC.

Trotter made his Orange County SC debut, coming on as a substitute in the 53rd minute, and set up an equaliser to help the side draw 2–2 against New Mexico United on 24 March 2019. After the match, website Orange and Black Soccer Cast praised his performance, saying that: "Trotter's presence was a positive for the team, and his assist in the equalizing goal was first class." Two weeks later on 7 April 2019, he set up the first goal of the game, in a 2–0 win over Colorado Springs Switchbacks. Trotter became a first team regular for the side, playing in the midfield position. At some point, he played in the centre–back position when needed. However, he suffered a knee injury in July that saw him sidelined for the rest of the 2019 season. Trotter went on to make sixteen appearances in his first season at Orange County SC.

=== Bromley ===
On 2 September 2020, Trotter returned to England to join National League side Bromley. On 10 October, Trotter made his debut for the club when he came off of the bench in the 27th minute of a late 2–1 defeat to Torquay United. On 1 December 2020, Trotter scored his first goal for the club, scoring the third in a 4–1 demolition of King's Lynn Town. On 22 May 2022, Trotter made his final appearance for Bromley, coming on as a substitute in Bromley's 1–0 win against Wrexham in the 2022 FA Trophy Final.

=== Chelmsford City ===
On 3 June 2022, Trotter signed for National League South club Chelmsford City. Following the culmination of the 2022–23 season, during which he helped Chelmsford to the FA Cup first round and a fifth placed finish, as well as winning Chelmsford's player of the season award, Trotter retired from football.

== Personal life ==
Born and raised in Ipswich, Trotter was educated at St Helen's Primary School and Northgate High School, in Ipswich, which he left in 2004. There he was a member of the school football team.

During his time at Millwall, Trotter earned a nickname from his teammates: Del Boy from Only Fools and Horses. Growing up, he idolised Iván Campo and Eric Cantona.

== Career statistics ==
As of match played 2 April 2021

Appearances and goals by club, season and competition
Club	Season	League			FA Cup		League Cup		Other		Total	
Club	Season	Division	Apps	Goals	Apps	Goals	Apps	Goals	Apps	Goals	Apps	Goals
Ipswich Town	2005–06	Championship	1	0	0	0	0	0	—		1	0
Ipswich Town	2006–07	Championship	0	0	1	0	0	0	—		1	0
Ipswich Town	2007–08	Championship	6	1	1	0	0	0	—		7	1
Ipswich Town	2008–09	Championship	3	1	0	0	2	0	—		5	1
Ipswich Town	2009–10	Championship	12	0	0	0	0	0	—		12	0
Ipswich Town	Total		22	2	2	0	2	0	0	0	26	2
Millwall (loan)	2006–07	League One	2	0	0	0	0	0	1 (Note: Appearance in Football League Trophy)	0	3	0
Grimsby Town (loan)	2008–09	League Two	15	2	0	0	0	0	1	0	16	2
Scunthorpe United (loan)	2008–09	League One	13	1	0	0	0	0	1 (Note: Appearance(s) in League One play-offs)	0	14	1
Millwall (loan)	2009–10	League One	20	1	0	0	0	0	3	0	23	1
Millwall	2010–11	Championship	35	7	0	0	2	1	—		37	8
Millwall	2011–12	Championship	35	6	5	1	0	0	—		40	7
Millwall	2012–13	Championship	36	6	5	0	1	0	—		42	6
Millwall	2013–14	Championship	19	3	0	0	0	0	—		19	3
Millwall	Total		125	22	10	1	3	1	0	0	138	24
Bolton Wanderers (loan)	2013–14	Championship	16	1	0	0	0	0	—		16	1
Bolton Wanderers	2014–15	Championship	14	1	2	0	2	0	—		18	1
Bolton Wanderers	2015–16	Championship	13	1	3	0	0	0	—		16	1
Bolton Wanderers	2016–17	League One	20	2	1	1	1	0	1 (Note: Appearance(s) in EFL Trophy)	0	23	3
Bolton Wanderers	Total		47	4	6	1	3	0	1	0	57	4
Nottingham Forest (loan)	2015–16	Championship	9	1	0	0	0	0	—		9	1
AFC Wimbledon	2017–18	League One	42	3	2	0	0	0	1	0	45	3
AFC Wimbledon	2018–19	League One	19	1	2	0	1	0	3	0	25	1
AFC Wimbledon	Total		61	4	4	0	1	0	4	0	70	4
Orange County SC	2019	USL Championship	16	0	0	0	—		0	0	16	0
Bromley	2020–21	National League	26	2	2	0	—		2 (Note: Appearance(s) in FA Trophy)	0	30	2
Career total			372	40	24	2	9	1	13	0	418	43

== Honours ==
Ipswich Town

- FA Youth Cup: 2004–05

Millwall

- Football League One play-offs: 2010

Bromley

- FA Trophy: 2021–22
