= Adam Seymour =

Adam Seymour may refer to:

- Adam Seymour (cricketer) (born 1967), former English cricketer
- Adam Seymour (musician), guitarist and songwriter
