= Adam Seymour (cricketer) =

English cricketer

Personal information
- Born: 7 December 1967 (age 58); Royston, Hertfordshire
- Batting: Left-handed
- Bowling: Right-arm medium

Career statistics
Competition	First-class	List A
Matches	36	32
Runs scored	1,699	442
Batting average	29.80	15.78
100s/50s	2/7	0/2
Top score	157	62*
Balls bowled	24	108
Wickets	0	1
Bowling average	–	77.00
5 wickets in innings	–	0
10 wickets in match	–	0
Best bowling	–	1/5
Catches/stumpings	17/–	10/–
- Source: CricketArchive, 10 October 2022

Adam Charles Hilton Seymour (born 7 December 1967) is a former English cricketer who played for a variety of teams in his 12-year career; most of his games were for Essex and Worcestershire.

== Career ==
Batting at number eight, Seymour scored 102 not out at the age of 16 for Essex Second XI against their Middlesex counterparts at South Hampstead. Essex II, however, lost the game by one wicket. He made more than 20 further appearances for Essex II and Essex Under-25s, the bulk of these in 1985, but failed to make a 50.

Seymour was given his first-class debut by Essex in May 1988, when he was chosen for the match against Cambridge University at Fenner's, hitting 33* down the order in a comfortable Essex victory. This was the first first-class game to be umpired by Vanburn Holder. He made no first-team appearances in 1989, but played some very good innings at Second XI level, including 168* and 42* against Lancashire II in September.

His next chance in the first team came in 1990, when he made his List A debut against the Zimbabweans at Chelmsford; he opened the batting with John Stephenson, but made only 6 before falling lbw to Eddo Brandes. Two days later Seymour played in a first-class game against Cambridge at Fenner's, making 28 and 89. He was soon out of the team again, though, and was not recalled until June 1991, when he made 67 against Worcestershire at Ilford. After one more Second XI game, Seymour enjoyed the longest run in the Essex first team of his career, lasting almost until the end of the season; the highlight was the career-best 157 he made against Glamorgan at Cardiff in late July.

For 1992 Seymour moved to Worcestershire, making an immediate impression for his new county by scoring 133 in his first innings, against Oxford University at The University Parks. He thus became only the fifth player to hit a century on his Worcestershire debut. He held down a first-team place until the middle of June, but the lack of any more major scores saw him largely relegated to the seconds thereafter. 1991 and 1992 were the only years in which Seymour passed 500 first-class runs in a season.

He played regular first-team cricket for the first part of 1993, but made only one fifty in either form of the game, hitting an unbeaten 54 against the Australians at Worcester in early May. Seymour shared in a defiant unbroken stand of 121 with Stuart Lampitt after Worcestershire had been forced to follow on. He accompanied Worcestershire on their 1993–94 tour of Zimbabwe, scoring 30 against a Matabeleland Invitation XI at Bulawayo. In 1994 he was almost a one-day specialist for Worcestershire, turning out in nine List A matches but only three first-class games; these were the last first-class matches of his career. A minor one-day highlight was his solitary wicket at first-team level: that of Norfolk's Rodney Bunting, whom he trapped lbw in a first-round NatWest Trophy match at Lakenham in June.

In 1994–95, Seymour travelled to New Zealand to play state cricket with Northern Districts. He made only two appearances, both in one-day games against Wellington at the Basin Reserve; in the first of these, his 62 earned him the man-of-the-match award. Returning to England, he played only a handful of Second XI matches for Essex in 1995, as well as playing for Cornwall in minor counties cricket, something he also did in 1997. In June 1995, he played List A cricket for Cornwall in the NatWest Trophy, but made a duck against Middlesex.

1998 saw Seymour switch minor counties to Suffolk, for whom he played a considerable number of games until 2000. He never reached three figures for Suffolk, but twice came close in August 1998, when he made 99 and 84 against Lincolnshire at Ipswich. He played the final List A game of his career in May 2000, when he scored 22 against Lancashire Cricket Board at Mildenhall in the NatWest Trophy.

Seymour played club cricket after his county career had wound down. Around the turn of the 21st century he played for Clacton in the East Anglian Premier League. In May 1999 he produced an excellent all-round display as Clacton beat Bury St Edmunds, first claiming 4–10 in eight overs of "practically unplayable" spin (not the medium-pacers he had occasionally used in his earlier career) and then hitting 60 not out. He later played in the Essex Cricket League for Colchester and East Essex; in two single-innings matches against Gidea Park and Romford he made 100* and 87*.
