= Tom Miller (artist) =

Baltimore artist

Thomas Patton Miller (1945–2000), who went by the name Tom Miller, was a Baltimore artist best known for his "Afro-Deco" painted furniture. He was born in the Sandtown-Winchester neighborhood and attended Carver Vocational Technical High School. In 1963, he received a scholarship to the Maryland Institute College of Art (MICA). After graduation, he taught art in the Baltimore City public schools for two decades before returning to MICA for his MFA, which he received in 1987.

Miller turned the traditional Baltimore crafts of painted screens and furniture into platforms for the exploration of history and race through color, whimsy, wit, and design. Stylistically, his work "has numerous roots, notably African art and art deco." A local favorite, "Miller's work was exhibited regularly in Baltimore galleries, and he enjoyed a devoted following among collectors here, who often waited up to two years to purchase examples of his work. Miller's furniture and sculpture were the subject of a major retrospective at the Baltimore Museum of Art and Maryland Art Place in 1995, and he was represented in several important group shows that toured the country." From 1991 to 1998, commissioned by the Mayor's Advisory Committee on Arts and Culture, he created six murals on themes related to racial pride and the Black community.

Openly gay, Miller learned in 1989 that he was HIV-positive. Some of his later works "touch on the universal theme of coming to terms with mortality." He died in 2000 from AIDS-related complications. His work is in the collections of the Baltimore Museum of Art, the Maryland Historical Society, the Reginald F. Lewis Museum of Maryland African American History and Culture in Baltimore, MD; the National Museum of African American History and Culture in Washington, DC; and the David C. Driskell Center at the University of Maryland, in College Park, MD, among other institutional and private collections.
