= Jackie Owen =

Scottish footballer (1881–1924)

Personal information
- Full name: John Russell Owen
- Date of birth: 1881
- Place of birth: Busby, Scotland
- Date of death: 1924 (aged 42–43)
- Position: Inside forward

Senior career*
Years	Team	Apps	(Gls)
1900–1901	Rutherglen Victoria		
1901–1902	Leven Victoria		
1902–1903	Hibernian		
1903	→ Aberdeen (loan)		
1903–1904	Barnsley	1	(0)
1904–1905	Morton		
1905–1907	Barnsley	37	(13)
1907–1911	Bolton Wanderers	90	(19)
1911	Chorley		
Total		128	(32)
- * Club domestic league appearances and goals

John Russell Owen (1881–1924) was a Scottish footballer who played in the Football League for Barnsley and Bolton Wanderers.
