= Robert Davies (footballer, born 1876) =

English footballer

Bob Davies
Personal information
- Date of birth: 1876
- Place of birth: Bolton, Lancashire, England
- Position: Left back

Youth career
- Tonge Lower End
- Haugh Albion
- Bolton Lads Club

Senior career*
Years	Team	Apps	(Gls)
189?–1895	Halliwell Rovers	??	(??)
1895–1899	Bolton Wanderers	29	(0)
1899–1900	Bedminster	30	(5)
1900–1903	Bristol City	77	(2)
- * Club domestic league appearances and goals

Robert H. Davies (born 1876) was an English footballer who played as a left back. He made 65 Football League appearances and 60 Southern League appearances in the years before the First World War.

== Career ==
Bob Davies played locally for Tonge Lower End, Haugh Albion and Halliwell Rovers. Davies joined Bolton Wanderers in July 1895 from Halliwell Rovers to play for four seasons in Division One but only in the final season as a regular for Bolton Wanderers. Davies moved south to play with Bedminster in the Southern League. When Bedminster merged with Bristol City in the summer of 1900, Davies stayed with the merged club. Davies played one season in the Southern League with Bristol City and then the following two seasons in Division Two as City were elected to the Football League.

== Honours ==
with Bristol City

- Southern Football League runner up: 1900–01
