= David McFetteridge =

Scottish footballer

David McFetridge was a Scottish footballer who played as a forward for Cowlairs, Bolton Wanderers, Derby County and Newton Heath.
