= Thomas Miller (Queen's Park footballer) =

Scottish footballer

Personal information
- Full name: Thomas Miller
- Place of birth: Scotland
- Position: Left back

Senior career*
| Years | Team | Apps | (Gls) |
| 1913–1915 | Queen's Park | 3 | (0) |
| 1915 | Vale of Leven | 2 | (0) |
- * Club domestic league appearances and goals

Thomas Miller was a Scottish amateur footballer who played as a left back in the Scottish League for Queen's Park and Vale of Leven.

== Personal life ==
Allan served as a sapper in the Royal Engineers during the First World War.

== Career statistics ==
Appearances and goals by club, season and competition
| Club | Season | League | | | National Cup | | Other | | Total | |
| Club | Season | Division | Apps | Goals | Apps | Goals | Apps | Goals | Apps | Goals |
|---|---|---|---|---|---|---|---|---|---|---|
| Queen's Park | 1913–14 | Scottish First Division | 1 | 0 | 0 | 0 | 0 | 0 | 1 | 0 |
| Queen's Park | 1914–15 | Scottish First Division | 2 | 0 | — | | 0 | 0 | 2 | 0 |
| Queen's Park | Total | | 3 | 0 | 0 | 0 | 0 | 0 | 3 | 0 |
| Vale of Leven | 1914–15 | Scottish Second Division | 2 | 0 | — | | — | | 2 | 0 |
| Career total | | | 5 | 0 | 0 | 0 | 0 | 0 | 5 | 0 |
