= Nelson Howarth =

English footballer (1904–1945)

Personal information
- Full name: Nelson Howarth
- Date of birth: 1904
- Place of birth: Irlams o' th' Height, England
- Date of death: 1945 (aged 40–41)
- Position: Wing half

Senior career*
| Years | Team | Apps | (Gls) |
| 1921–1922 | Urmston Old Boys | | |
| 1922–1926 | Bolton Wanderers | 35 | (2) |
| 1926–1929 | West Bromwich Albion | 61 | (1) |
| 1929 | Runcorn | | |
| 1930 | Loughborough Corinthians | | |
| Total | | 96 | (3) |
- * Club domestic league appearances and goals

Nelson Howarth (1904–1945) was an English footballer who played in the Football League for Bolton Wanderers and West Bromwich Albion.
