= Suffolk and Ipswich Football League =

Association football league in England

- Founded: 1896
- First season: 1896–97
- Country: England
- Divisions: Premier; Championship; Division 2-5
- Level on pyramid: Level 11 (Premier Division)
- Feeder to: Eastern Counties League
- Promotion to: Eastern Counties League; Division One
- Domestic cup(s): Suffolk Senior Cup; Suffolk Senior Reserve Cup; Suffolk Junior Cup; Suffolk Primary Cup
- League cup(s): Morrison Freight Cup; Divisional Cup; Reserve Cup
- Current champions: Coplestonians (Premier Division); Ransomes Sports (Championship); (2025–26)
- Website: Official website

The Suffolk and Ipswich Football League is a football competition based in Suffolk, England. The league has a total of six divisions; the Premier Division, Championship and Division 2-5. Only first teams of member clubs are permitted to play in the Premier Division and Championship. Divisions 2-5 contains teams, Reserve and 'A' teams of member clubs. Reserve teams must have one full division separating them and their first team counterpart; Reserve and 'A' teams may not be in the same division but do not require separation. Teams are arranged in to their divisions at the Annual General Meeting

The Premier Division is at step 7 (or level 11) of the National League System. The league was founded in 1896 as the Ipswich & District League changing its name in 1978.

The Premier Division champions may apply for promotion to the Eastern Counties League Division One. Clubs from the league to progress up the pyramid include Whitton United, Sudbury Town, Hadleigh United, Woodbridge Town, Needham Market, Walsham-le-Willows, Debenham LC, and Halesworth Town.

The league is affiliated to the Suffolk County Football Association.

== History ==
The Ipswich and District League was established in 1896 at the initiative of Frederick Gibbons, the secretary of St Lawrence Works. Gibbons placed an advert in the East Anglian Daily Times stating that he intended to launch a football league for Ipswich and the surrounding area. The inaugural meeting on 10 September 1896 was attended by officials from 18 clubs including Brantham Athletic, Ipswich Town and Orwell Works. Local MP Daniel Ford Goddard, who became the league's first president, promised to provide a trophy for the league, and the league commenced in October with two divisions of eight clubs. Although Ipswich Town had opted not to join, several other clubs that had not attended the initial meeting did, including Felixstowe Town, Stowmarket and Woodbridge Old St Mary's.

Divisions between the Amateur Football Association (AFA) and the Football Association (which had created a split in the Suffolk County Football Association) led to a small number of clubs leaving the league (which was affiliated to the AFA) in 1910 and setting up a rival FA Ipswich & District League. More clubs left the AFA version of the league in 1911, which ran with just twelve clubs across its two divisions. Although 21 clubs attended the league's annual general meeting in August 1912 and it was initially agreed to have ten clubs in Division One and eleven in Division Two, seven of the clubs elected to Division One walked out of the meeting. the 1912–13 season saw ten clubs compete in the AFA version of the league and 14 in the FA version, a situation that continued in 1913–14. Although the dispute between the AFA and FA were resolved in 1914, resulting in rival leagues merging to form a three-division competition, the outbreak of World War I saw the league abandoned in September 1914.

When the league resumed in 1919 it had grown to five divisions. Division One was renamed the Premier Division in 1950, with a new Division One created above the sectional Division Twos. By 1971 the league had expanded to ten divisions. In 1978 the league was renamed the Suffolk & Ipswich League and the Premier Division became the Senior Division.

For the 2025-26 season, the Senior Division was renamed Premier Division and Division 1 was renamed to Championship.

== 2026–27 members ==
=== Premier Division ===
AFC Kesgrave | Bacton United 89 | Coplestonians | Debenham LC | East Bergholt United | Grundisburgh | Haughley United | Henley Athletic | Kirton Athletic | Leiston St Margarets | Leiston Under 23s | Old Newton United | Ransomes Sports | Sporting 87 | Stowupland Falcons | Tattingstone United | Trimley Red Devils

=== Championship ===
Bramford United | Capel Plough | Cockfield United | Coddenham Athletic | Coplestonians Reserves | East Bergholt United Reserves | Framlingham Town 'A' | Kesgrave Kestrels | Saxmundham Sports | Stanton Community | Thurston | Whitton United | Witnesham Wasps | Woolverstone United

=== Division Two ===
Achilles | AFC Kesgrave Reserves | Claydon | Elmswell Community | Halesworth Town Development | Hadleigh United Brettsiders | Halesworth Development | Haugley United Reserves | Ipswich Exiles | Occold | Samuels | Sporting 87 Reserves | Stonham Aspal | Trimley Red Devils Reserves

=== Division Three ===
Bacton United 89 Reserves | Benhall St Mary | Grundisburgh Reserves | Kesgrave Kestrels Reserves | Kirton Athletic Reserves | Laxfield | Leiston St Margarets Reserves | Old Newton United Reserves | Ransomes Sports Reserves | Redgrave Rangers | Sporting 87 'A' | Stowupland Falcons Reserves | Whitton United Reserves

=== Division Four ===
AFC Kesgrave 'A' | Benhall St Mary Reserves | Bramford United Reserves | Brooks Hall Rovers | Capel Plough Reserves | Claydon Reserves | Cockfield United Reserves | Coplestonians Development | Hope Church | Long Melford Reserves | Mendlesham | Walsham-le-Willows Development | Woodbridge Town Reserves | Woolverstone United Reserves

=== Division Five ===
Achilles Reserves | Bacton United 89 ‘A’ | Coldham Hall | East Bergholt United 'A' | Elmswell Community Reserves | Kesgrave Kestrels Development | Needham Market Phoenix | Stanton Community Development | Stowmarket Mental Health | Thurston Reserves | Wickham Market | Witnesham Wasps Reserves

== List of divisional champions ==
Season	Division One	Division Two	
1896–97	Stowmarket	St Matthews	
1897–98	Stowmarket	West End Excelsiors	
1898–99	Woodbridge Old St Marys	Brantham Athletic	
1899–1900	Stowmarket	St Peters	
1900–01	Leiston	St Clements Rangers	
1901–02	Leiston	Leiston reserves	
1902–03	Leiston	Westgate Ward Liberals	
1903–04	28th RGA Landguard	Woodbridge Town	
1904–05	Orwell Works	Westbourne Athletic	
1905–06	Orwell Works	Westbourne Mills	
1906–07	Orwell Works	Stoke Athletic	
1907–08	Stowmarket	St Clements United	
1908–09	Westbourne Mills	Woodbridge Town	
1909–10	Stowmarket	Stowmarket reserves	
1910–11	Felixstowe Town	Stowmarket reserves	
1911–12	Orwell Works	All Saints United	
1912–13	Woodbridge Town (AFA); Stowmarket (FA)	Hadleigh (AFA); G Battery RHA (FA)	
1913–14	Walton United (AFA); Stowmarket (FA)	Stoke Athletic and YMCA jointly (AFA); Brantham Athletic (FA)	
Season	Premier Division	Division Two A	Division Two B
1919–20	Bury United	Life Bridgade Old Boys	Stoke Athletic
1920–21	Walton United	Great Eastern Railway	Stoke Guild
1921–22	Stowmarket	St Marys Elms Old Boys	Woodbridge Comrades
1922–23	Harwich & Parkeston	Manganese Bronze	Woodbridge Comrades
1923–24	RAF Martlesham	Bramford Works	Clarkson Street Athletic
1924–25	RAF Felixstowe	HMS Ganges	Leiston St Margarets
1925–26	Walton United	Manningtree	Woodbridge Town
1926–27	HMS Ganges	St Johns	Kingsway Athletic
1927–28	HMS Ganges	Shotley Swifts	Kingsway Athletic
1928–29	Lowestoft Waveney Athletic	Ipswich Town reserves	Aldeburgh Town
1929–30	Newmarket Town	Parkeston Railway reserves	Stoke Institute
1930–31	Stoke Institute	Ipswich Town reserves	Orwell Works reserves
1931–32	RAF Martlesham	Barham House	Ipswich Town reserves
1932–33	Orwell Works	Needham Market	Ipswich Town reserves
1933–34	Newmarket Town	Hadleigh United	Ipswich Town reserves
1934–35	Sudbury Town	Parkeston Railway	Atlas
1935–36	Orwell Works	Parkeston Railway	Melton St Andrews
1936–37	Felixstowe Town	Manningtree Rovers	Wickham Market
1937–38	Orwell Works	Manningtree Rovers	Leiston
1938–39	Orwell Works	Stoke United	Melton St Andrews
1945–46	Achilles and HMS Ganges jointly	No Division Two	
1946–47	Whitton United	Needham Market	
1947–48	Whitton United	Needham Market	Bramford Road Old Boys
1948–49	Achilles	Hadleigh & District	Grundisburgh
1949–50	Waterside Works	Great Blakenham	Grundisburgh
Season	Premier Division		
1950–51	Waterside Works	Grundisburgh	
1951–52	Waterside Works	Great Blakenham	
1952–53	Sudbury Town	Needham Market	
1953–54	Hadleigh United	Landseer	
1954–55	Waterside Works	RAF Martlesham	
1955–56	Waterside Works	Eastern Old Boys	
1956–57	Hadleigh United	Christchurch Athletic	
1957–58	Felixstowe Town	Orwell Works	
1958–59	Waterside Works	Ipswich Lads Club	
1959–60	Electric Supply	Grundisburgh	
1960–61	Orwell Works	Ranelagh Road Old Boys	
1961–62	Orwell Works	Ranelagh Road Old Boys	
1962–63	Waterside Works	Heath Row	
1963–64	Waterside Works	Melton United	
1964–65	Felixstowe Town	Priory Heath Old Boys	
1965–66	Whitton United	Westerfield United	
1966–67	Electric Supply	Priory Heath Old Boys	
1967–68	Whitton United	Wetheringsett	
1968–69	Electric Supply	Rushmere Athetic	
1969–70	ICI Paints	Nicholians	
1970–71	Heath Row	Woodbridge Town	
1971–72	Nicholians	Bull Motors	
1972–73	Hadleigh United	Bull Motors	
1973–74	Nicholians Locomotive	Alan Road	
1974–75	Crane Sports	Stutton	
1975–76	Nicholians	Wickham Market	
1976–77	Hadleigh United	Haughley United	
1977–78	Bull Motors	Caribbeans	
Season	Senior Division	Division One	
1978–79	Hadleigh United	Murrayside	
1979–80	Nicholians Locomotive	Coplestonians	
1980–81	Ransomes	Bramford Road Old Boys	
1981–82	Westerfield United	Old Newton United	
1982–83	Haughley United	Halesworth Town	
1983–84	Westerfield United	Leiston	
1984–85	Westerfield United	BT Research	
1985–86	Achilles	Murrayside	
1986–87	RSSC Ransomes	Woodbridge Town	
1987–88	Achilles	YMCA Fonnereau Athletic	
1988–89	Woodbridge Town	Halesworth Town	
1989–90	Grundisburgh	Walsham-le-Willows	
1990–91	Grundisburgh	Melton St Audrys	
1991–92	Framlingham Town	Westerfield United	
1992–93	Whitton United	Achilles	
1993–94	Grundisburgh	Nicholians	
1994–95	Whitton United	Walsham-le-Willows	
1995–96	Needham Market		
1996–97	Haughley United		
1997–98	Grundisburgh		
1998–99	Walton United		
1999–2000	Grundisburgh		
2000–01	Grundisburgh		
2001–02	Walsham-le-Willows		
2002–03	Walsham-le-Willows	Cockfield United	
2003–04	East Bergholt United	AFC Debenham	
2004–05	East Bergholt United	Stonham Aspal	
2005–06	East Bergholt United	Coplestonians	
2006–07	Grundisburgh	Stonham Aspal	
2007–08	Brantham Athletic	Woodbridge Athletic	
2008–09	Grundisburgh	Old Newton United	
2009–10	Old Newton United	Haughley United	
2010–11	Grundisburgh	Leiston St Margarets	
2011–12	Woodbridge Athletic	Coplestonians	
2012–13	Ipswich Valley Rangers	Westerfield United	
2013–14	Achilles	Bramford United	
2014–15	Crane Sports	Ipswich Athletic	
2015–16	Crane Sports	Ransomes Sports	
2016–17	Henley Athletic	Benhall St Mary	
2017–18	Achilles	Claydon	
2018–19	Crane Sports	Old Newton United	
2019–20	League abandoned due to COVID-19 pandemic		
2020–21	League abandoned due to COVID-19 pandemic		
2021–22	Henley Athletic	Sporting 87	
2022–23	Henley Athletic	Stowupland Falcons	
2023–24	Henley Athletic	Thurston	
2024–25	Old Newton United	Somersham	
2025–26	Coplestonians	Ransomes Sports	

== Domestic Cups ==
Teams from the league are entered into 4 of the County's 5 County Cup competitions.

- Suffolk Senior Cup: Premier Division sides
- Suffolk Senior Reserve Cup: Division 2 to 5 sides, that are reserve teams of teams playing in the Senior Cup
- Suffolk Junior Cups: Championship and Division 2 Sides
- Suffolk Primary Cup: Division 3 to 5 sides

They compete against other sides that are affiliated to Suffolk FA but play in other leagues. These leagues include Cambridgeshire County, Anglian Combination, Essex & Suffolk Border, Lowerstoft & District^{1} and Central & South Norfolk^{1}.

^{1} No teams from this league enter the Senior Cup

== League Cups ==
The league also runs a league cup, known as the Morrison Freight sponsored Bob Coleman Cup (or the Morrison Freight Cup). It has previously been known as the Omnico Cup and the McNeil League Knock–Out Cup

=== List of winners ===
- 1976–77 Hadleigh United
- 1977–78 Needham Market
- 1978–79 Woodbridge Town
- 1979–80 Needham Market
- 1980–81 Hadleigh United
- 1981–82 Hadleigh United
- 1982–83 Ransomes
- 1983–84 Westerfield United
- 1984–85 Westerfield United
- 1985–86 Haughley United
- 1986–87 Hadleigh United
- 1987–88 Achilles
- 1988–89 Grundisburgh
- 1989–90 Framlingham Town
- 1990–91 Grundisburgh
- 1991–92 Framlingham Town
- 1992–93 Grundisburgh
- 1993–94 Whitton United
- 1994–95 Stanton
- 1995–96 Haughley United
- 1996–97 Brantham & Stutton United
- 1997–98 Grundisburgh
- 1998–99 Walsham-le-Willows
- 1999–2000 Walsham-le-Willows
- 2000–01 Grundisburgh
- 2001–02 Walsham-le-Willows
- 2002–03 Old Newton United
- 2003–04 East Bergholt United
- 2004–05 Crane Sports
- 2005–06 Ransomes Sports
- 2006–07 Melton St Audrys
- 2007–08 Grundisburgh
- 2008–09 Ransomes Sports
- 2009–10 Ransomes Sports
- 2010–11 Crane Sports
- 2011–12 Haughley United
- 2012–13 Crane Sports
- 2013–14 Grundisburgh
- 2014–15 Ipswich Athletic
- 2015–16 Achilles F.C.
- 2016–17 Benhall St Mary
- 2017–18 Crane Sports
- 2018–19 Henley Athletic
- 2019-20 Competition abandoned due to COVID-19 pandemic
- 2020-21 Competition abandoned due to COVID-19 pandemic
- 2021-22 Halesworth Town
- 2022-23 Henley Athletic
- 2023-24 Tattingstone United
- 2024-25 Wickham Market

=== Cup Eligibility ===
- Morrison Freight Cup: for teams in the Premier Division and Divisions 1, plus non-reserve sides in Division 2 and first team sides in Division 3 that have a reserve team. Premier Division teams enter at the last 32 stage.
- Reserve Cup: for Reserve teams whose first team is in the Morrision Freight Cup.
- Divisional Cup: for teams in Divisions 3-5, not playing in the Morrison Freight Cup or the Reserve Cup
