= Thomas Miller (Scottish footballer) =

Scottish footballer

Personal information
- Full name: Thomas Hanning Miller
- Date of birth: 1 March 1907
- Place of birth: Hamilton, Scotland
- Date of death: 10 April 1974 (aged 67)
- Place of death: Burnley, England
- Position: Outside left

Senior career*
Years	Team	Apps	(Gls)
–1931	Blantyre Celtic		
1931–1932	Heart of Midlothian	0	(0)
1932–1933	Newcastle United	0	(0)
1933–1934	Burnley	5	(1)
- Oakengates Town
- Accrington Stanley
- * Club domestic league appearances and goals

Thomas Hanning Miller (1 March 1907 – 10 April 1974) was a professional Scottish footballer who played as an outside left in the Football League for Burnley.
