= Charlie Ostick =

English footballer

Personal information
- Full name: Charles Ostick
- Date of birth: 9 March 1875
- Place of birth: Chorley, England
- Date of death: 1954 (aged 78–79)
- Position: Full back

Senior career*
Years	Team	Apps	(Gls)
1899–1900	Chorley		
1900–1906	Bolton Wanderers	84	(0)
Total		84	(0)
- * Club domestic league appearances and goals

Charles Ostick (9 March 1875 – 1954) was an English footballer who played in the Football League for Bolton Wanderers.
