= Tom Miller (1890s footballer) =

English footballer

Personal information
- Full name: Thomas Miller
- Place of birth: England
- Position: Centre forward

Senior career*
Years	Team	Apps	(Gls)
1896–1899	Bolton Wanderers	48	(12)
Total		48	(12)
- * Club domestic league appearances and goals

Thomas Miller was an English footballer who played in the Football League for Bolton Wanderers.
