= Ransomes and Reavell Sports Club Ground =

Cricket ground in Ipswich, England

Coordinates: 52°03′56″N 1°11′03″E

Ransomes Sports Pavilion (formerly Ransomes and Reavell Sports Club Ground)
Ground information
- Location: Ipswich, Suffolk
- Establishment: 1972 (first recorded match)

Team information
Suffolk	(1972-present)
- As of 13 August 2010; Source: Ground profile

Ransomes Sports Pavilion (formerly Ransomes and Reavell Sports Club Ground) is a cricket ground in Ipswich, Suffolk. The first recorded match on the ground was in 1972, Suffolk played Hertfordshire in the ground's first Minor Counties Championship match. Since then, the ground has hosted 48 Minor Counties Championship matches, including the rain-affected 2005 final between Suffolk and Cheshire in 2005, which was drawn. and 2 MCCA Knockout Trophy matches.

The ground has also hosted a single List-A match which saw Minor Counties East play Middlesex in the 1978 Benson and Hedges Cup.

The ground is the home of St Margaret's Cricket Club and Ransomes Sports Football Club.
