= Achilles F.C. =

Association football club in England

Coordinates: 52.046087°N 1.137509°E

Achilles
- Full name: Achilles Football Club
- Founded: 1937
- Ground: Pauls Social Club, Ipswich
- Chairman: Dave Morgan
- League: Suffolk & Ipswich League Championship
- 2024–25: Suffolk & Ipswich League Division One, 12th of 13

Achilles Football Club is a football club based in Ipswich, Suffolk, England. The club are currently members of the Suffolk & Ipswich League Championship and play at Pauls Social Club.

== History ==
The club was established in 1937 by a merger of St Clements United and St Clements Institute and initially played at Murray Road. They joined the Ipswich & District League (now the Suffolk & Ipswich League), winning the title in 1943–44, 1945–46 (shared with HMS Ganges) and 1948–49. They entered the FA Cup in 1948–49 and 1949–50, but failed to advance beyond the second qualifying round. At the time, they also played in the FA Amateur Cup.

In the late 1960s the club moved to its present ground at Pauls Social Club. They won the league again in 1985–86 and 1987–88, a season in which they also won the League Cup. The club won its sixth league title in 2013–14.

== Honours ==
- Suffolk & Ipswich League
  - Senior Division champions 1943–44, 1945–46 (shared), 1948–49, 1985–86, 1987–88, 2013–14
  - League Cup winners 1987–88

== Records ==
- Best FA Cup performance: Second qualifying round, 1948–49

== See also ==
- Achilles F.C. players
