= Ransomes Sports F.C. =

Association football club in England

Coordinates: 52°03′55.79″N 1°11′03.30″E

Ransomes Sports
- Full name: Ransomes Sports Football Club
- Founded: 1948 (as Fisons FC)
- Ground: Ransomes and Reavell Sports Club Ground, Ipswich
- Chairman: Russell Haynes
- Manager: Lee Laparvlo
- League: Suffolk & Ipswich League Premier Division
- 2025–26: Suffolk & Ipswich League Championship, 1st of 13 (promoted)

Ransomes Sports Football Club is a football club based in Ipswich, Suffolk, England. The club are currently members of the Suffolk & Ipswich League Premier Division and play at the Ransomes and Reavell Sports Club Ground.

== History ==
The original Ransomes were established as Orwell Works, the works team of the Ransomes engineering company. They played in the Suffolk & Ipswich League, winning the league three seasons in succession between 1904–05 and 1906–07. They had one season in the East Anglian League in 1909–10, but continued in the Suffolk & Ipswich League, winning back-to-back league titles in 1960–61 and 1961–62, before changing their name to Ransomes F.C.. After winning the Suffolk Senior Cup in 1979, they won the Senior Division and Senior Cup double in 1980–81 and the League Cup in 1982–83. In 1986 they became RSSC Ransomes, and won the league again in 1986–87. They also entered the FA Vase for several seasons during the 1980s, reaching the third round in 1982–83 and 1987–88. The club folded at the end of the 1994–95 season.

After the original football club folded, the Ransomes Sports Club invited Rushmere Athletic to take over at the ground. Rushmere had been established as Fisons F.C. in 1948, but had been made homeless after their parent company sold their ground to Ipswich Town to use as a training ground in 1993. The club was renamed Ransomes Sports in 1997. In 1998–99 they finished runners-up in Division Two, and were promoted to Division One. They were promoted again the following season, earning a place in the Senior Division. Although they were relegated back to Division One soon after, they were promoted to the Senior Division again in 2003–04. The club won the League Cup in 2005–06, 2008–09 and 2009–10. In 2011–12 the club was relegated back to Division One, and were relegated again to Division Two at the end of the 2013–14 season. They were promoted from Division Two in 2014–15 and were Division One champions in 2015–16, resulting in promotion to the Senior Division. However, they finished bottom of the Senior Division in 2017–18 and were relegated again. At the end of the 2019–20 season they were promoted back to the Senior Division. After spending two seasons out of the top flight they gained promotion back to the Premier Division after an unbeaten league in season 2025-26, winning the Championship and the Suffolk Junior Cup at Portman Road.

== Honours ==
- Suffolk & Ipswich League
  - Senior Division champions 1904–05, 1905–06, 1906–07, 1960–61, 1961–62, 1980–81, 1986–87
  - Division One champions 2015–16, 2025-26
  - League Cup winners 1982–83, 2005–06, 2008–09, 2009–10
- Suffolk Senior Cup
  - Winners 1979, 1981
- Suffolk Junior Cup
  - Winners 2026

== Records ==
- Best FA Vase performance: Third round, 1982–83, 1987–88
