= Peckham (surname) =

Peckham is a surname, and may refer to:

- Adelaide Ward Peckham (1848–1944), American physician, bacteriologist and academic
- Anthony Peckham, American screenwriter and producer
- Brian Peckham (1934–2008), Canadian biblical scholar
- Catherine Peckham (born 1937), British paediatrician
- Ethel Anson Peckham (1879–1965), American horticulturist
- George Peckham (born 1942), English recording engineer
- George Peckham (merchant) (died 1608), English merchant venturer
- George and Elizabeth Peckham, American teachers and arachnologists in the 19th century
- Harry Peckham (1740–1787), English writer and judge
- Henry Peckham (MP for Wycombe) (1526–1556), English courtier and Member of Parliament
- Henry Peckham (MP for Chichester) (1615–1673), English parliamentarian
- Howard Henry Peckham (1910–1995), American historian
- James Peckham (c.1346–1400), English politician
- Jim Peckham (1929–2011), American wrestler and coach
- Joel Peckham, American poet, literary scholar and creative writer
- John Peckham (c.1230–1292), Archbishop of Canterbury
- Judy Peckham (born 1950), Australian runner
- Lawrie Peckham (born 1944), Australian high jumper
- Lucy Creemer Peckham (1842–1923), American nurse, physician and poet
- Mary Peckham (1839–1893), American author and reformer
- Matt Peckham (born 1972), American journalist
- Michael Peckham (1935–2021), British oncologist and artist
- Michele Peckham, American politician
- Paul Hunter Peckham, American biomedical engineer
- Raymond Edward Peckham (1929–2025), Aboriginal Australian activist
- Rick Peckham (born 1955), American sports broadcaster
- Robert Peckham (artist) (1785–1877), American portrait painter
- Robert Peckham (historian), British writer and historian of science, technology and medicine
- Robert Francis Peckham (1920–1993), American judge
- Robin Peckham, arts writer, gallerist and curator in Hong Kong
- Rufus Wheeler Peckham (1809–1873), New York Court of Appeals judge
- Rufus W. Peckham (1838–1909), U.S. Supreme Court justice
- Simon Peckham (born 1962), British businessman
- Susan Atefat-Peckham (1970–2004), Iranian-American poet
- Theo Peckham (born 1987), Canadian ice hockey player
- Thomas Peckham (1691–1724), English landowner
- Tim Peckham (1900–1957), bNew Zealand rugby league footballer
- Tom Peckham (born 1943), American wrestler
- Wayne Peckham (1944–2016), Indigenous Australian rugby league footballer
- Wheeler Hazard Peckham (1833–1905), American lawyer
- William Peckham (1689–1765), English landowner
- William Pitt Peckham, American politician

== See also ==
- Packham
