= Europa Donna =

European network

Europa Donna – The European Breast Cancer Coalition
- Formation: 1994; 32 years ago
- Type: Non-profit organisation
- Headquarters: Milan, Italy
- Region served: Europe
- Website: www.europadonna.org

Europa Donna – The European Breast Cancer Coalition is an independent non-profit organisation whose members are affiliated groups from 47 countries throughout Europe. The organisation was founded by a group of women from various European countries in 1994. Its head office is in Milan, Italy.

Europa Donna works to raise awareness of breast cancer and to improve breast cancer services by promoting early detection, optimal treatment and research. It holds information campaigns such as Breast Health Day on October 15 to raise awareness of the role of lifestyle choices in reducing the risk of breast cancer.

The organisation promotes access to optimal breast cancer services by collaborating with European and national policymakers. Its efforts at the European Parliament led to the adoption of the European Parliament Resolutions on Breast Cancer and the Written Declaration on the Fight Against Breast Cancer. Europa Donna works with European scientific organisations and is a co-organiser of the European Breast Cancer Conference in partnership with the European Society of Breast Cancer Specialists (EUSOMA) and the European Organisation for Research and Treatment of Cancer (EORTC). It provides the patient's perspective on international breast cancer trial committees and is a member of the Breast International Group Scientific Committee. The organisation holds Pan European Conferences for advocates every two years as well as annual Advocacy Training courses.

== History and Organisation ==
At the EUSOMA congress in Paris, France, in 1993, Italian breast surgeon Umberto Veronesi presented the concept of a European organisation of women to increase breast cancer awareness and represent patients and women. A small group of women from various European countries then began to establish the organisation, which started as an educational arm of the European School of Oncology.

Under a constitution signed in 1996, Europa Donna is headquartered in Milan, Italy, and is overseen by an Executive Board consisting of a maximum of nine members, three of whom must be breast cancer survivors. The coalition comprises 47 member countries, called fora, whose national delegates elect the members of the Executive Board. Europa Donna’s activities focus on policy, education, prevention and research. The organisation has been the recipient of an operating grant from the European Commission.
