= European School of Oncology =

Non-profit organisation for oncology training and education

The European School of Oncology (ESO) is a provider of continuing medical education to oncology professionals, with a particular focus on areas of Central and Eastern Europe and the Balkans region.

It is a non-profit organisation, based in Milan, Italy, that is independently funded via two foundations ‒ the ESO Foundation (ESOF) and the Fondazione per la Formazione Oncologica (FFO), primarily through a legacy left to the School by the last surviving members of the family Necchi-Campiglio.

== History ==
The School was founded in 1982 by Umberto Veronesi, an Italian breast surgeon and Scientific Director of the National Cancer Institute of Milan. The concept, first outlined at the 1981 founding congress of the European Society of Surgical Oncology, was for a permanent interdisciplinary and international school, free from non-medical influence, and in line with the medical traditions of the 'Old Continent' of Europe, which were seen as distinct from the medical culture in the US, in putting a greater emphasis on the therapeutic importance of the doctor‒patient relationship.

The founding scientific leadership of the School was drawn from a range of oncology disciplines and European countries. They included Michael Peckham, a UK-based radiotherapist and co-founder of the European Society for Therapeutic Radiology and Oncology (now European Society for Radiotherapy and Oncology),; Herbert Pinedo, a leader in the emerging specialism of medical oncology, based in the Netherlands, and author of early editions of Cancer Chemotherapy; Franco Cavalli, a Swiss haematologist and founding member of the European Society for Medical Oncology, Louis Denis, a urologist and founder member of the European Organisation for Research and Treatment of Cancer genito-urinary group; and Umberto Veronesi himself, an Italian breast surgeon, who had developed and trialled the quadrantectomy technique for breast conserving surgery and initiated the first trials investigating the impact of adjuvant chemotherapy in operable breast cancer.

=== Multiprofessional cancer care education ===
The first ESO oncology course was held in 1982 in the Castello di Pomerio in Lombardy northern Italy, near Milan. The teaching faculty comprised most of the School's founders, and the course covered the principles of management of the main cancers from a multidisciplinary standpoint. In its early years the School concentrated on post-graduate courses in medical oncology, which at that time was treated in most of Europe as a branch of internal medicine, rather than a specialism requiring its own curriculum and qualifications. From 2001, the School began to focus much of its work on countries in Central and Eastern Europe and the Balkans region, where survival rates for cancer were markedly lower than in Western Europe and Northern Europe. It also started to widen its areas of work to support oncologists at different stages in their careers, starting from the time they leave medical school. In 2002 ESO ran the first five-day Masterclass in Clinical Oncology. In 2004 it initiated a summertime Oncology for Medical Students course. In 2008 the e-ESO distance learning programme was started, to increase global access to oncology education. In 2012 ESO launched a visiting professors programme, primarily to support clinical institutes in Eastern Europe and the Balkan Region. In 2013 it added a scheme for clinical training fellowships at centres of excellence across Europe, and also set up certificates of competence as specialist qualifications in lymphoma, breast cancer, and gastrointestinal cancer, and a certificate of advanced studies in lung cancer, which run in collaboration with the University of Ulm, the University of Zurich and the Università della Svizzera italiana. In 2020 the School set up the ESO college ESCO, to bring all these different initiatives into a structure that alumni can pursue step by step.

== Societies ==
ESO is a member of the Union for International Cancer Control and the European Cancer Organisation.

== Journal ==
The ESO official journal is Critical Reviews in Oncology/Hematology, which publishes critical reviews in all fields of oncology and hematology, as well as reviews and original research in the field of geriatric oncology.

== Awards ==
Since March 2017 ESO assigns the Umberto Veronesi Memorial Award, a prize that is biennially awarded in honour to Umberto Veronesi, one of the ESO co-founders. The winners were:

- 2017: Giuseppe Curigliano (director of the Division of Experimental Therapeutics at the European Institute of Oncology, Milan, Italy);
- 2019: Lesley Fallowfield (professor of Psycho-oncology and Director of the Sussex Health Outcomes Research & Education in Cancer (SHORE-C) group at Brighton & Sussex Medical School);
- 2021: Fatima Cardoso (director, Breast Unit, Champalimaud Clinical Center, Lisbon, Portugal; president, ABC Global Alliance);
- 2023: Benjamin Olney Anderson (Medical Officer, Cancer Control Lead, Global Breast Cancer Initiative (GBCI) WHO Headquarters, Geneva).
