= Patrick Schöffski =

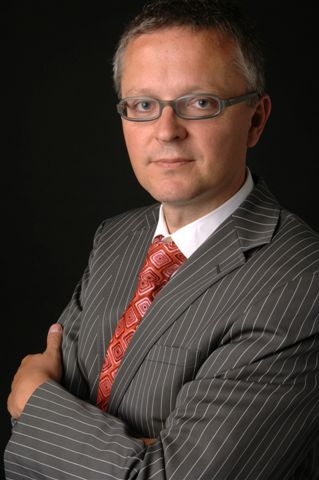

Personal details
- Born: 27 December 1963 (age 62) Hannover, Germany

Patrick Schöffski is a German medical doctor specializing in internal medicine, hematology and medical oncology.

== Early life and education ==
Schöffski originates from Hannover, Germany, where he also received a master's degree in public health at Hannover Medical School.

== Career ==
After working as a physician at Hannover Medical School, Hannover (Germany) in the early phase of his career Schöffski became the head of the Department of General Medical Oncology at the University Hospitals Leuven where he also leads the Laboratory of Experimental Oncology at KU Leuven, Belgium. He was Secretary-General of the Executive Committee and Board of the European Organisation for Research and Treatment of Cancer (EORTC), member of the board of directors of the European Cancer Organisation (ECCO) and the Connective Tissue Oncology Society (CTOS). He is a current member of the American Society of Clinical Oncology (ASCO) and the American Association for Cancer Research (AACR). He is the past Chair of ASCO's Membership Committee. In 2013 he was appointed member of the Belgian Royal Academy of Medicine. Schöffski was faculty and the Scientific Chair of the Methods in Clinical Cancer Research Workshop series in Flims, Switzerland, organized by AACR, ECCO, ESMO and EORTC.

He was Work Package Leader in the Connective Tissue Cancers Network (CONTICANET), a Network of Excellence funded by the European Commission's Sixth Framework Programme, is a member of the EURACAN network for rare malignancies and involved in the development and update of important European clinical practice guidelines for rare cancers including sarcoma.

In 2019 Schöffski founded FORTRESS, the Forum for Translational Research in Sarcomas, an annual meeting for scientists involved in laboratory research in the field of soft tissue and bone sarcoma and gastrointestinal stromal tumors. The meeting series is organized in collaboration with researchers from KU Leuven and Westdeutsches Tumorzentrum in Essen (Germany), alternates between Leuven and Essen, and is strongly supported by patient advocacy groups.

=== Research ===
Schöffski's main clinical interest is the treatment of solid tumors and lymphomas. He is involved in prospective clinical trials (Phase I-III) in various tumor types, with a focus on orphan malignancies. He leads an active phase I trial team in Leuven and is responsible for a number of multitumor and sarcoma trials. He has been involved in registration trials of antineoplastic agents in a variety of solid tumors with significant activity in rare malignancies and sarcoma.

His translational interest has a focus on mesenchymal malignancies. His team has developed >85 very exclusive, well-characterized, patient-derived xenograft models of human sarcomas ready to use for collaborative projects. The XenoSarc platform is supported by a related, extensive clinical database (LECTOR), huge collections of sarcoma tissue microarrays and longitudinal blood samples from sarcoma patients.

== See also ==
- EORTC
