= Robert Peckham =

Robert Peckham may refer to:

- Robert Peckham (artist) (1785–1877), American portrait painter
- Robert Peckham (historian)
- Robert Peckham (MP) (1516–1569), English politician
- Robert Francis Peckham (1920–1993), United States District Judge for California
