= Smoking in Italy =

Smoking in Italy has been banned in public places including bars, restaurants, discotheques and offices since 2005. A majority of Italians supported the ban at the time it was first implemented, but there was a lack of support from smokers and some bar owners. 5% of bar and restaurant owners immediately introduced separate smoking rooms.

== History ==
Christopher Columbus was the first European to discover tobacco. He described how indigenous people in Cuba used tobacco by lighting dried herbs wrapped in a leaf and inhaling the smoke. According to ItalianSmokes.com, in 1561, Bishop Prospero Santacroce while in Portugal discovered the healing properties of a tobacco type called Nicotiana Rustica. He then brought the seeds back to Italy. Around 1574, Niccolo Tornabuoni, who served as the Florentine ambassador to Paris, introduced the seeds of another tobacco variety known as Nicotiana Tabacum to Tuscany. By the end of the 16th century, various new strains were derived and were cultivated in Tuscany, Lombardy, Piedmont, Veneto, Marche, Umbria, Campania, Sardinia, and Sicily. For more than 300 years, the growth of tobacco in Italy was influenced by a complex taxes and regulations imposed by the different states before their unification into the modern nation in 1859. In 1861 the government created the national monopoly Monopolio dello Stato to purchase all tobacco leaves and manufacture and sell tobacco products, After 1818 Kentucky tobacco was farmed and fermented in Tuscany and Umbria, and is responsible for the commercial success of the Toscano cigar.

After 1919, cigarettes became dominant among men, Women slowly adopted smoking—fewer than 10% in 1965. Philip Morris advertised heavily in Italy and across Western Europe, especially through sponsorship of Formula I auto racing. By 1975 its Marlboro brand held a fourth of Italy's cigarette market.

=== Since 1975 ===
Early anti-smoking legislation was introduced in Italy, when on 11 November 1975 law no. 584 was passed, prohibiting smoking on public transport and in some public places such as hospitals, cinemas, theaters, universities, museums, and libraries. In 1986, Health Minister Costante Degan unsuccessfully tried to implement a smoking ban in bars and restaurants, but the push would be neglected amid other concerns.

After almost two decades, a comprehensive ban of smoking in all public places was finally introduced by Health Minister Girolamo Sirchia on 16 January 2003, making Italy the 4th European country to introduce a smoking ban in all public places. Heart attacks in Italian adults dropped significantly following the implementation of the smoking ban. The decline in heart attacks was attributed to less passive smoking. Health Minister Girolamo Sirchia said that smoking was the leading preventable cause of death in Italy. The ban caused an 8% decrease in cigarette consumption. However, rates of law enforcement are not uniform in the country; higher in Northern Italy, Tuscany and Sardinia, much lower in Southern Italy, especially in Calabria (70%) and Campania (76%).

== Prevalence ==
The smoking rate in Italy between 2000 and 2020 is about 23.7%. Furthermore, data shows a general downward trend in smoking rate between 2000 and 2016. In 2005 when smoking was banned in public places the rate was about 25.6% and fell to the current level of about 23.7%.

== Zeno's Conscience ==
Zeno's Conscience is a 1923 novel by Italian writer Italo Svevo; the English translation is entitled Confessions of Zeno. The main character is Zeno Cosini, and the book is the fictional character's memoirs that he keeps because his fictional psychiatrist recommended it. Zeno first writes about his cigarette addiction and cites the first times he smoked. In his first few paragraphs, he remembers his life as a child. One of his friends bought cigarettes for his brother and him. Soon, he steals money from his father to buy tobacco, but finally decides not to do this out of shame. Eventually, he starts to smoke his father's half-smoked cigars instead.

The problem with his "last cigarette" starts when he is twenty. He contracts a fever and his doctor tells him that to heal he must abstain from smoking. He decides smoking is bad for him and smokes his "last cigarette" so he can quit. However, this is not his last and he soon becomes plagued with "last cigarettes." He attempts to quit on days of important events in his life and soon obsessively attempts to quit on the basis of the harmony in the numbers of dates. Each time, the cigarette fails to truly be the last. He goes to doctors and asks friends to help him give up the habit, but to no avail. He even commits himself into a clinic, but escapes. The whole theme, while objectively serious, is often treated in a humorous way.

== Economic impact ==
=== Medical cost ===
Tobacco use is a leading cause of many life-threatening diseases, with significant public health and economic impacts. It is strongly associated with the development of a number of cancers, including cancers of the oesophagus, stomach, lung, pancreas, bladder and larynx. In addition, smoking is a major contributor to cardiovascular diseases such as ischaemic heart disease, stroke and other artery-related diseases, including microarterial and capillary diseases. Smoking also has a serious impact on the respiratory system, leading to diseases such as chronic obstructive pulmonary disease (COPD), pneumonia and influenza. It is estimated that smoking causes more than 90,000 deaths per year in Italy alone, highlighting the enormous burden it places on the healthcare system.

The World Health Organisation (WHO) reports that the tobacco epidemic is one of the most serious public health problems currently facing the world. The economic burden of tobacco use is enormous, including the high health costs of treating smoking-related diseases and the loss of human resources due to smoking-related morbidity and mortality.

Based on an analysis of the 2018 dataset, which includes almost 1 million hospital discharge reports for 12 smoking-related diseases, there is a significant association between smoking and hospital admissions and health care costs for these diseases, with smoking directly linked to around one third of hospital admissions, totalling over 320 000 hospitalisations and over €1.64 billion in costs.

In 2018, a third of the 12 smoking-related diseases in Italy were caused by smoking among people over 30, accounting for €1.64 billion in healthcare costs. Of the diseases analysed, ischaemic heart disease, cerebrovascular diseases and lung cancer were the most expensive, costing €556 million, €290 million and €229 million respectively.

=== Loss of productivity ===
Studies show that productivity losses associated with premature deaths due to smoking are evident in several countries. In Italy, premature deaths from cancer in 2008 had a total cost of €7.2 billion, reflecting lost jobs, reduced tax revenues and increased social security costs due to premature deaths. In the UK, France and Italy, the economic cost of premature deaths due to smoking ranges from 0.45% to 0.59% of GDP respectively.

Despite their importance to the global economy, premature deaths from smoking are a burden on their economies that cannot be ignored. In addition, smoking-related diseases have other social consequences, such as a lower quality of life for families, a greater demand on public resources and higher social protection costs.

It is estimated that there are 1.3 billion tobacco users worldwide, approximately 80% of whom live in low- and middle-income countries, which bear the greatest burden of tobacco-related disease and death. Tobacco use contributes to poverty by forcing households to divert funds from basic needs such as food and housing to purchase tobacco products. Because tobacco is addictive, it is difficult to control effectively.

== Smoking among physicians in Italy ==
In 1999, the Italian Gallup Group (Istituto Doxa), within the framework of a European project coordinated by the British Medical Association, carried out a survey on the smoking status of a representative sample of Italian doctors, of whom 24.2% were current smokers who smoked no more than 1 cigarette a day, 3.4% were occasional smokers and 26.5% were quitters. 24.2% of interviewee were current smokers who smoked no more than 1 cigarette a day, 3.4%were occasional smokers, 26.5% had quit smoking and 45.9 per cent had never smoked. Regarding the number of cigarettes smoked, 12.8 per cent reported smoking less than 15 cigarettes per day, 9.4 per cent smoked between 15 and 24 cigarettes per day and 2.0 per cent smoked no more than 25 cigarettes per day. At that time, smoking prevalence was similar for both men and women, and the subsequent age groups were also similar. However, the proportion of never smokers was higher and the proportion of quitters was lower among female physicians. Similarly, the proportion of never smokers was higher among younger physicians.

In 2025, a survey of Italian doctors found that 21.4% of doctors and 37.6% of nurses smoked. A more detailed analysis of gender differences among health professionals showed that 21.8% of smokers were men and 17.4% women, and that men smoked more than women overall.

=== Attitude ===
Another study in 2008 surveyed the attitudes of 1 082 health professionals towards smoking. The results showed that 92.3% of them think that a smoke-free policy in hospitals is useful and fair, while 90.7% are in favour of penalising smokers. However, only 1.5% said they would punish colleagues who smoke in front of them. In addition, 28.4% of healthcare workers said they would ask a colleague who smokes in front of them to leave, while 24% would rather ignore them .

In this survey, 90.1% of respondents reported seeing no-smoking signs on wards, and 90.5% reported seeing colleagues smoking in hospital. In particular, 47.4% of respondents saw smoking in family bathrooms, 33.4% saw smoking in doctors' department kitchens and 4.7% also saw smoking on the wards.

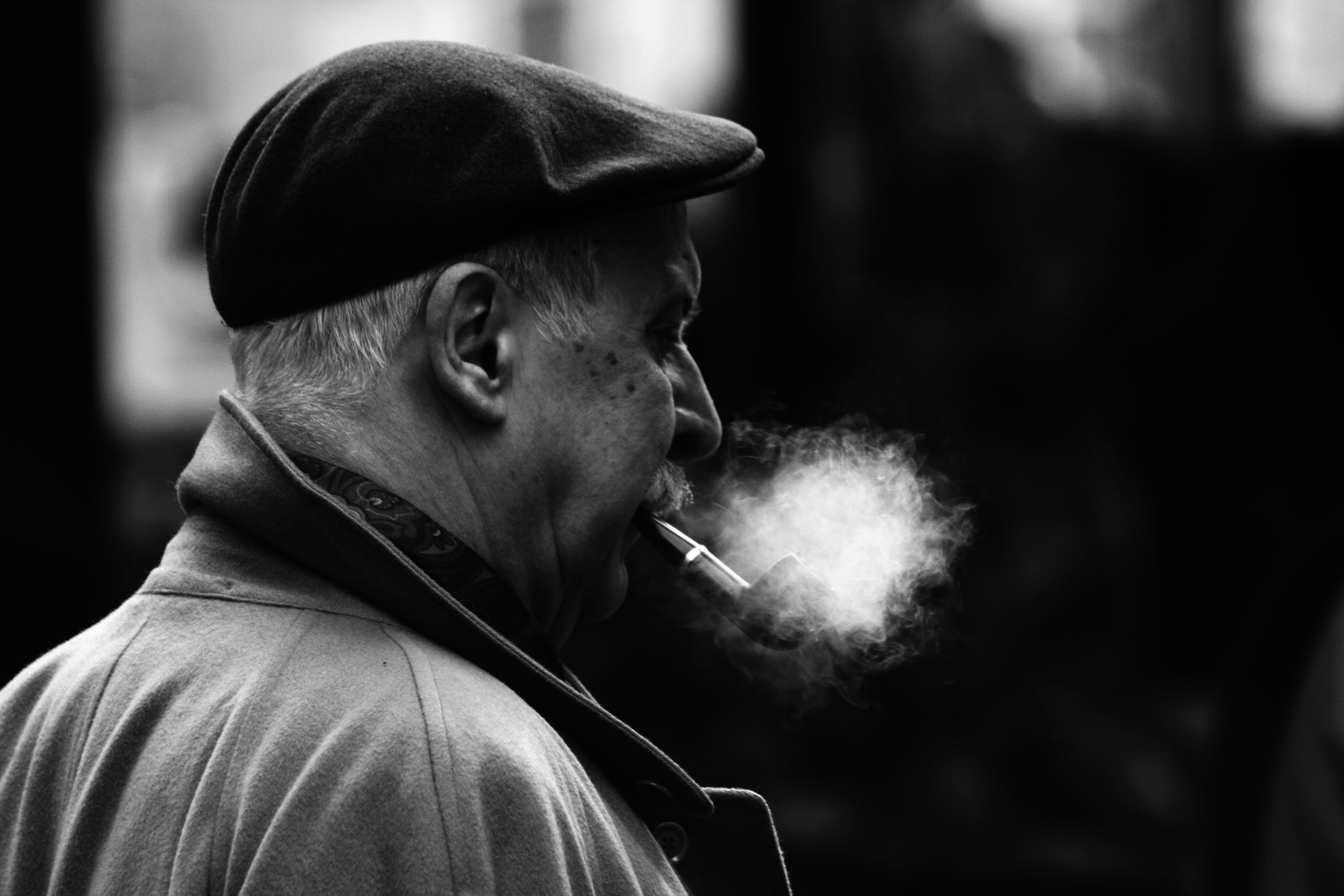

=== Causes and effects ===
In 2005, Italy became the third European country to introduce a nationwide ban on smoking in enclosed public places. Although smoking prevalence among the general population has declined over the years, there are still many smokers in the healthcare sector. Indeed, Italian medical students seem to underestimate the health risks associated with smoking, smoking-related deaths and the benefits of quitting. According to 2012 data, only 14% of smokers had been advised to quit by a doctor, compared to 20% in 2009. Smokers are especially less likely to be advised to quit if the doctor also smokes.

One of the main reasons why doctors often smoke may be the stressful nature of their work. Healthcare workers often face a heavy workload, with many working more than 50 hours a week and often having to work night shifts. Prolonged work under increased stress can lead health workers to take up smoking to relieve stress.

== Trends in smoking prevalence ==
=== Geographical differences ===
A survey was conducted in March and April 2008 and involved 3 035 Italians aged 15 and over (1 459 men and 1 576 women). The survey showed some differences in the geographical distribution of male smokers in Italy. 22% of men smoke in the north, 25.8% in the centre and 31.8% in the south. At the same time, the geographical differences are smaller for female smokers: 16.1% in the north, 20.8% in the centre and 18.4% in the south.

=== Gender difference ===
According to the study, smoking prevalence in the Italian population as a whole was 22.8% in 2007–2008, but fell to 21.4% in 2015–2016, with smoking prevalence among women falling from 18.6% to 17.2% and among men from 27.2% to 26.0%. This change reflects the differences in smoking prevalence between the sexes, as despite the relatively lower smoking prevalence among women, both sexes showed some decline.

=== Changes in smoking behaviour ===
Since the 1950s, smoking behaviour in Italy has changed dramatically under the influence of public health policies and social change. In terms of overall trends, smoking prevalence in Italy has been gradually declining from the 1950s to 2000, with the largest decline occurring between 1975 and 1980. This trend has had a particular impact on the male population, where smoking prevalence continued to decline, especially after 1975, when increased awareness of smoking cessation led to a significant reduction in male smoking prevalence. Women's smoking behaviour, on the other hand, is different. In the context of women's emancipation and changing social roles in the post-war period, smoking prevalence among women born in 1951-1960 gradually increased, but in the following years this trend began to slow down and gradually decline.

Changes in smoking prevalence in Italy are closely linked to various public health policies. Since the 1970s, the government has gradually implemented anti-smoking measures and health education and tobacco control policies to reduce the prevalence of smoking. These measures have included raising the price of cigarettes, restrictions on smoking in public places and increased anti-smoking advertising. In the late 1990s, anti-smoking policies were gradually strengthened, in particular by banning smoking in workplaces and public transport, which further contributed to the decline in smoking prevalence.

Since the late 1950s, smoking prevalence in Italy has fallen significantly among adults, but not among young people, where it is still over 20%. Italy has had laws prohibiting the sale of tobacco products to young people since 1935 and continues to strongly support the continued enforcement of laws prohibiting the sale of tobacco products to minors. In 2013, the Italian government raised the minimum age for purchasing tobacco products from 16 to 18.

In recent years, there has been a shift in the use of RYO cigarettes among Italian adult and youth smokers. According to the data, the popularity of RYO cigarettes increased significantly from 2011 to 2016. The consumption of RYO cigarettes increased from 3.4% in 2011 to 7.2% in 2015 and reached 9.4% in 2016. Among adult smokers, the use of RYO cigarettes increased from 6.0% in 2011 to 17.0% in 2015 and further to 18.6% in 2016. Among younger smokers, the prevalence of RYO cigarettes shows a similar upward trend, from 19.9% in 2011 to 36.9% in 2015 and declining slightly to 33.7% in 2016. This trend indicates a significant increase in the use of RYO cigarettes among the smoking population, despite a decline in overall smoking prevalence. One in five young smokers cite RYO cigarettes as their most commonly consumed tobacco product.

== Smoking-related diseases and public health challenges ==
=== Physiological influence ===
Smoking is the main cause of cancer in Italy, especially lung cancer, which is the most common type of cancer among Italian men and women. In 2020, around 17.3% of cancer cases were related to smoking, while in 2017, smoking-related cancer deaths accounted for 24.5% of all cancer deaths. Whereas among men and women, smoking causes 90.0 per cent and 58.3 per cent of lung cancers, 67.8 per cent and 53.5 per cent of pharyngeal cancers, 47.0 per cent and 32.2 per cent of bladder cancers, 45.9 per cent and 31.7 per cent of oral cancers, 36.6 per cent and 23.6 per cent of oesophageal cancers, and 23.0 per cent and 14.0 per cent of pancreatic cancers, respectively.

Smoking is one of the major contributing factors to lung cancer, and long-term smoking significantly increases the risk of lung cancer. In addition to lung cancer, smoking is also strongly associated with the development of many other types of cancer, including oesophageal, bladder and laryngeal cancers.

Bladder cancer caused by smoking is very common. Bladder cancer not only has a high recurrence rate, but also a poor prognosis and usually requires complex diagnostic procedures and treatments that strain healthcare resources and have a negative impact on patients' mental health.

In addition to the major systemic diseases described above, smoking increases the risk of accidents and injuries. From a public health perspective, smoking-related accidents represent an unnecessary additional burden, affecting both smokers and non-smokers living in the same neighbourhood or on the same road as smokers. Both occasional and regular smoking while driving is a risk factor for motor vehicle accidents, and the consistency of the epidemiological data and the likelihood of the association suggest that the association is real, as smoking increases known predictors of injury such as distraction, impairment and sensory disturbance in a dose-dependent manner.

As a result, governments and public health agencies usually reduce smoking prevalence by implementing anti-smoking policies, conducting anti-smoking campaigns, and increasing tobacco taxation to reduce the burden of smoking-induced cancers and other disease-related burdens. For example, Italy's first nationwide campaign in 1975–1976, with the slogan ‘Smokers are poisoning you too’; the Italian League Against Cancer has launched various initiatives; and the World No Tobacco Day has been celebrated annually in Italy since 1987; the National Health Plan (NHP) for 1998-2000 includes tobacco control as one of its main objectives and is implemented through specific actions, including national and regional health education interventions for students and pregnant women, as well as monitoring of existing legislation. ‘The National Health Plan (NHP) 1998-2000 includes tobacco control as one of its main objectives, implemented through specific actions, including national, regional and local measures, health education interventions for students and pregnant women, and the monitoring of the correct application of existing legislation.

=== Psychological influence ===
Smoking is strongly linked to a range of mental health problems. Studies show that smoking can cause psychological problems such as mood disorders, anxiety disorders and psychosis. In addition, people with mental health conditions are more likely to become addicted to smoking, creating a vicious cycle. Although people with mental illness may smoke to relieve symptoms associated with their illness. However, there is evidence that giving up smoking can actually improve mental health symptoms (Minichino et al. 4790).

Studies show that 45% of people with major depressive disorder smoke, so this group of patients is also in the spotlight. Despite the high prevalence of smoking among people with anxiety disorders, surprisingly little attention is paid to how best to treat this patient group. In general, however, clinicians should not hesitate to encourage patients with mental health problems to quit smoking. Smoking cessation not only improves their physical health but can also improve, rather than worsen, their mental health.

In addition, smoking also affects the metabolism of psychiatric drugs, which in turn has a significant impact on the course of psychiatric disorders and is therefore considered an important factor in individual differences in drug response.

Nicotine is the main cause of tobacco's psychological effects on humans. After smoking, nicotine quickly enters the bloodstream through the lungs and spreads to the brain, where it binds to the nicotinic acetylcholine receptor (nAChR), which has a high affinity for nicotine, and triggers the release of various neurotransmitters, in particular dopamine. This process usually leads to rapid and pulsatile activation, especially in the midbrain limbic system, resulting in a sense of reward and a positively reinforcing experience. Research suggests that this neural pathway plays a key role in the development of addiction to nicotine and other drugs of abuse.

Nicotine is metabolized primarily by cytochrome P450 1A2 (CYP1A2) and CYP2A6. As many psychotropic drugs, including diazepam, haloperidol, olanzapine, clozapine, flufenazine and mirtazapine, are also metabolised by induction of CYP1A2, smoking reduces the blood levels and effectiveness of these drugs.

Nicotine is metabolised primarily by cytochrome P450 1A2 (CYP1A2) and CYP2A6. Many psychotropic drugs, including diazepam, haloperidol, olanzapine, clozapine, flufenazine, and mirtazapine, are also metabolised through the induction of CYP1A2. Smoking therefore leads to a decrease in the concentration of these drugs in the blood, thus reducing their efficacy. The effect of smoking on the metabolism of these drugs means that smokers may need to adjust the dosage of the drug or take other measures to ensure the therapeutic effect of the drug when taking the above drugs. In addition, smoking may alter the half-life of the drug, further affecting its duration and effect in the body. Therefore, when prescribing psychotropic medications to patients who smoke, clinicians need to give special consideration to the effects of smoking on drug metabolism in order to make reasonable therapeutic adjustments.

== See also ==
- European Tobacco Products Directive
- Health in Italy
