= Peckham (disambiguation) =

Peckham is a district in southeast London.

Peckham may also refer to:

== Places ==
- Peckham (ward), London
- East Peckham, Kent, England
  - Peckham Bush, Kent, England
- West Peckham, Kent, England
- Peckham (London County Council constituency)
- Peckham (UK Parliament constituency)

== People ==
- Peckham (surname)
