= Guido Venosta =

President of the most important Italian non-profit association

Guido Venosta (November 3, 1911 – February 4, 1998), was an Italian entrepreneur and manager.

Venosta served as president of the nonprofit organization Italian Association for Cancer Research (AIRC) for 20 years, and established the Italian Foundation for Cancer Research (FIRC).

== Biography ==
After graduating in Economics from St. John's College, Cambridge, and in Law from the University of Pavia, Venosta worked at Pirelli where, from 1956 to 1963, he was head of the English branch.

In 1966, Venosta began working with the Italian Association for Cancer Research (now the AIRC Foundation for Cancer Research), founded the previous year by Umberto Veronesi and Giuseppe Della Porta. From 1967, he served as vice president of the Association and then, from 1976, as president.

In 1979, Venosta proposed the establishment of the Italian Foundation for Cancer Research (FIRC), an endowment fund for financing Cancer Research, and the FIRC Research Unit, composed of scientific groups working on specific cancer-related topics. In 1996, he arranged for the FIRC to make a ten-year donation of 2 billion lire to the University of Milan for the establishment of the Department of Oncology and Hematology-Oncology. Venosta's work in the association led to the creation and organization of AIRC's regional committees and initiatives that are still running today, such as Azalee della Salute (Azaleas for Health) and Arance della Salute (Oranges for Health).

After stepping down as president of both organizations in 1996, Venosta was appointed honorary president of both until his death in Milan in 1998.

== Guido Venosta Biennial Award ==
Since 1998, the Guido Venosta AIRC Biennial Award has been awarded in his name. The award is reserved for researchers who have distinguished themselves in research aimed at developing new therapeutic approaches to neoplasms. The award, which also gives a fifty thousand euro scholarship, is presented by the President of Italy during a ceremony at the Quirinale Palace as part of the celebrations for National Cancer Research Day.

== Guido Venosta Foundation ==
Guido Venosta also has a Foundation named after him. This foundation is now headed by Giuseppe Caprotti. The Foundation is involved in initiatives for the prevention and support of new forms of poverty, free public transport for the less well-of resident, and theatrical performances to raise public awareness of social and health issues. It has supported the Le Comunità della Salute (Health Communities) project to reduce inequalities in access to prevention and medical care.

== Awards ==
- Fecs – Pezcoller Recognition Award for contribution to oncology, 1994
- Certificate of Civic merit "Ambrogino d’Oro", 1989
- Inscribed among the distinguished citizens of the city and nation in the Famedio del Monumentale as a "pioneer of non-profit organizations"
- Dedication of a street in the Municipality of Milan, 2023

== Honors ==
- Commander of the Order of Merit of the Italian Republic, 1983
- Grand Officer of the Order of Merit of the Italian Republic, 1988
- Gold Medal of Merit for Public Health, 1990

== Publications ==
- Guido Venosta, Dal profit al non-profit. Storia di un’esperienza, Milano, All’insegna del pesce d’oro, 1997, ISBN 978-88-444-1398-9
