= Packiam =

Packiam is a surname. Notable people with the surname include:

- Glenn Packiam (born 1978), Malaysian-American musician and pastor
- Julius Packiam, Indian film score composer

== See also ==
- Packham
