= Gordon McVie =

British oncologist and cancer researcher (1945–2021)

John Gordon McVie FRCP FRCPE FRCPGlas FMedSci
- Born: 13 January 1945; Glasgow, Scotland
- Died: 20 January 2021 (aged 76); Bristol, England
- Citizenship: United Kingdom
- Education: University of Edinburgh
- Known for: Cancer research, Clinical Trials, Personalised Care
- Scientific career
- Fields: Cancer research, clinical trials
- Workplaces: Netherlands Cancer Institute; European Institute of Oncology; Italian Institute for Molecular Oncology; Cancer Research Campaign; Cancer Research UK ecancer.org
- Doctoral advisor: Gordon Hamilton-Fairley

John Gordon McVie FRCP FRCPE FRCPGlas FMedSci (13 January 1945 – 20 January 2021) was an international authority on the treatment and research of cancer. He wrote over 350 peer-reviewed articles, editorials and books. McVie was born in Glasgow, Scotland and died of non-Hodgkin lymphona and COVID-19 in Bristol, England.

He served on several committees including the American Association for Cancer Research and the American Society of Clinical Oncology, and the boards of the National Cancer Institutes of France, Italy and the Netherlands. In the UK, he served on the boards of cancer institutes including the Beatson Institute for Cancer Research, the Institute for Cancer Research, and the Christie Hospital.

He was a visiting professor, King's College London, Senior Clinical Research Consultant at the Italian Institute for Molecular Oncology (IFOM) Milan, and Non Executive Director at Ellipses Pharma Ltd, UK Chair of ORIL, Australia and Chair of the European Alliance for Personalised Medicine.

He contributed several substantial additions to the field of cancer care including establishing localised, more pin-point, administration of chemotherapy, and encouraging the use of chemotherapy for the treatment of lung cancer throughout the EU.

== Education ==
McVie obtained his degrees in science and medicine at the University of Edinburgh in 1969, and became a lecturer in Therapeutics and Materia Medica, University of Edinburgh.

== History ==
In 1970, McVie took an MRC research fellowship at Edinburg University, Department of Therapeutics, investigating Hodgkin lymphoma. In 1975 McVie became the Foundation Senior Lecturer at the Cancer Research Campaign Oncology Unit (currently Beatson West of Scotland Cancer Centre) at the University of Glasgow. Under Gordon Hamilton-Fairley and Sir Kenneth Calman, he trained in the United States, spending sabbaticals at the NCI, Bethesda, Paris, Sydney, Australia and Amsterdam.

In 1979, McVie became the Clinical Research Director at the Netherlands Cancer Institute, and Consultant in Medical Oncology at the Antoni van Leewenhoek hospital in Amsterdam. He developed a drug development laboratory, and a clinical research unit, for Phase 1 and 2 drugs, plus establishing intraperitoneal therapy in ovarian cancer and limb perfusion in localised sarcoma and melanoma.

At the European Organisation for Research and Treatment of Cancer (EORTC) he started the lung cancer group and researched standard chemotherapy / irradiation regimes which were adopted for small and non small cell lung cancer, mesothelioma and thymoma. As Chair of the Pharmacology and Metabolism Group he developed a platform for young investigators to present new molecules and their pharmacology. He was elected President of EORTC and initiated the present Drug Development Group in Brussels, and with NCI support, the European New Drug Development Network and the joint EORTC, NCI, CRC Formulation Committee for anti cancer molecules.

In 1989 McVie became the Scientific Director then Director General of the Cancer Research Campaign. During this time over 60 new drugs were taken from laboratory to clinical trial, and carboplatin, temozolomide, olaparib and abiraterone, all important “breakthrough” anticancer drugs, emerged. In the UK he was one of the architects of the Cancer Trials Networks in Scotland, Wales, and England, and was a founding member of the National Cancer Research Institute, UK.

Having overseen a doubling of Cancer Research Campaign charitable income, he led the merger with ICRF to found Cancer Research UK (CRUK), the largest cancer charity in Europe.

In 2002 McVie became joint CEO of Cancer Research UK with Sir Paul Nurse, where he continued to support new molecule testing and support start-up companies.

Then in 2003 McVie founded a new endeavour, Cancer Intelligence, then with the late Umberto Veronesi - a free online global cancer journal ecancer.org, which was published for eleven years in Zurich, then moved to become a UK charity.

In 2004 McVie became a Senior Consultant of Clinical Research at the European Institute of Oncology, Milan. He set up a clinical research unit to test new molecules and devices, and synergised the new institute with other leading cancer centres throughout the world.

In 2016 he joined the Italian Institute for Molecular Oncology in Milan.

== Honours and distinctions ==
1967 Gunning Victoria Jubilee Prize in Pathology
1977 Honeyman Gillespie Lecturer in Medicine
1978 Visiting Fellow, University of Paris, Department of Medical Oncology
1979 Visiting Fellow, Netherlands Cancer Institute, Amsterdam
1980 Consultant, Carcinogenesis of Cytostatic Drugs, International Agency Research in Cancer, WHO, Lyon
1983 Visiting Professor, University of Sydney, NSW Australia
1990–1996 Visiting Professor, British Postgraduate Medical Federation, London University
1990–1998 Chairman UICC Fellowships Program and Board member (Union Internationale Contre le Cancer/International Union Against Cancer)
1994–1997 President, European Organisation for Research and Treatment of Cancer
1994–2002 First European Editor of Journal of the National Cancer Institute, US
1995 King of Jordan’s Medal for Excellence in Science
1996 DSc (Hon) University of Abertay, Dundee
1996–2000 Visiting Professor, University of Glasgow
1997 DSc (Hon) University of Nottingham
1998 FMedSci (Fellow of the Academy of Medical Sciences)
1999 DSc (Hon) University of Portsmouth
2000 Semmelweis Medal for Excellence in Science, Budapest
2000 Medal of the National Scientific Research Fund of Belgium
2001 Silver Medal, Royal Scottish Society of Arts
2001 Medal of the National Cancer Society of Greece
2001 FRCSE (Hon) (Fellow of the Royal College of Surgeons), Ed
2002 DSc (Hon) Napier University, Edinburgh
2003–2006 Visiting Professor in Cancer Medicine, University of Cardiff
2005 DSc (Hon) University of Ghent, Belgium
2004 Fellow of the European Academy of Cancer Sciences
2005 MD (Hon), University of Bath
2017 Fellow of the Association of Cancer Physicians, UK
