= Edmund Verney (1528–1558) =

English politician (1528–1558)

Edmund Verney (25 July 1528 – 13 December 1558) was an English politician. He sat as MP for Buckinghamshire in March 1553 and 1555.

He was the first son of Sir Ralph Verney (died April 1546) of Pendley by Elizabeth, the daughter of Edmund Braye, 1st Baron Braye and the brother of Francis Verney. In 1546, he married Dorothy, daughter of Sir Edmund Peckham of Denham, Buckinghamshire. By 1555, he was married to Alice.
