= List of EORTC trials =

This page is a list of EORTC clinical trials sponsored by the European Organisation for Research and Treatment of Cancer (EORTC).

== Breast cancer ==
- EORTC 10085 – characterization of male breast cancer
- EORTC 10863 – continuous tamoxifen versus intermittent tamoxifen versus intermittent/alternated tamoxifen and medroxyprogesterone acetate
- EORTC 10951 – exemestane versus tamoxifen

=== Older studies ===
- Nafoxidine versus ethinylestradiol
- Levodopa versus nafoxidine

== Prostate cancer ==
The following prostate cancer trials have been conducted, among others:

- EORTC 30761 – cyproterone acetate 250 mg/day versus medroxyprogesterone acetate 200 mg/day versus diethylstilbestrol 3 mg/day
- EORTC 30762 – estramustine phosphate 280 mg/day (560 mg/day initially) versus diethylstilbestrol 3 mg/day
- EORTC 30805 – orchiectomy versus orchiectomy plus cyproterone acetate (150 mg/day) versus low-dose diethylstilbestrol (1 mg/day)
- EORTC 30843 – orchiectomy versus buserelin versus buserelin plus cyproterone acetate (150 mg/day)
- EORTC 30853 – orchiectomy versus goserelin plus flutamide (750 mg/day)
- EORTC 30892 – flutamide monotherapy (750 mg/day) versus cyproterone acetate (300 mg/day)
- EORTC 30903 – prednisone versus flutamide
- EORTC 30954 – intermittent combined androgen blockade (with GnRH agonist plus bicalutamide (50 mg/day))
- EORTC 30958 – intermittent combined androgen blockade
