= Robert Peckham (historian) =

British writer and historian

Robert Peckham is a British writer and historian of science, technology, and medicine. His most recent academic appointment was at the University of Hong Kong as MB Lee Professor in the Humanities and Medicine, Chair of the Department of History, and Director of the Centre for the Humanities and Medicine. He is the founder of Open Cube, "an organisation that promotes the integration of the arts, science, and technology for health."

== Biography ==
Robert Peckham is the son of the late Michael Peckham, an oncologist and artist, and Catherine Peckham, a paediatric epidemiologist. His grandfather, Alexander King, was a scientist and pioneer of the sustainable development movement who co-founded the think-tank the Club of Rome in 1968. Peckham attended the Lycée Français Charles de Gaulle and Westminster School, before going on to King's College London. He subsequently took up a Research Fellowship at St Catharine's College, Cambridge, and St Peter's College, Oxford.

== Career ==
In 2009, he founded the Centre for the Humanities and Medicine at the University of Hong Kong to develop an integrated research program bridging health, medicine, humanities and social sciences. He is also a visiting professor at the London School of Hygiene and Tropical Medicine and a Fellow of the Hong Kong Academy of the Humanities. He is founding editor of the series Histories and Ecologies of Health published by Pittsburgh University Press.

== Writing ==
Robert Peckham is best-known for his work on the history of epidemics in modern Asia. He has also written on the history of panic, on the putative links between disease and crime, and on the extrapolation of epidemiological modeling in financial theory. A key strand of this research has focused on the development of novel surveillance technologies and their implication for global health. His work has emphasized the importance of humanities and social science approaches to epidemics, including during the COVID-19 outbreak in Wuhan.
