= Mario Pappagallo =

Italian journalist and essayist

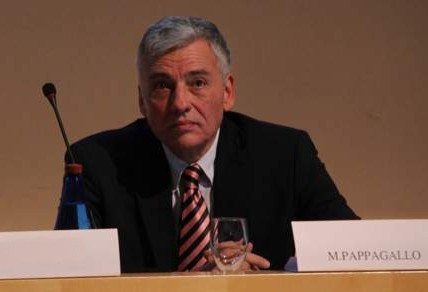
Mario Pappagallo (2011)

Mario Pappagallo (Rome, 1 June 1954 - 22 July 2022) was an Italian journalist and essayist. He lived in Milan, Italy.

== Biography ==
After studying medicine at the University of Rome "La Sapienza" and biological sciences at the University of Urbino, he received a master's degree in medical and scientific journalism from the University of Rome "Tor Vergata". He became a member of Italy's Order of Journalists in 1986.

In 1982, he joined the editorial staff of Tutti, a monthly magazine for the European youth. For Tutti, he broke the story of oil spills along the European coasts, in particular that of Amoco Cadiz.

In 1984, he participated in the project of Codice Salute, the information bulletin of the "Tribunale per i diritti del malato", an association upholding the rights of ill people. He wrote for the Corriere Medico from 1985 to 1990. At the end of the 1980s, his investigation in the medical faculties in Italian Universities led to a change in the curriculum of medical studies. In 1990, he joined Corriere Salute, the health weekly supplement of Corriere della Sera.

One of his articles for Corriere Salute appears in an anthology of Italian literature of the twentieth-century to illustrate the language of health journalism.

In 1992, he moved to the national news staff of Corriere della Sera. In 1995, he was senior editor. From May 2009 to April 2011, he was on the editorial committee of Corriere della Sera. He was senior editor in the National News staff of Corriere della Sera.

In 1992–1993, for Corriere della Sera and L'Europeo monthly magazine, he broke the story of the inquiry into the Italian Drug Commission. Mario was also a commentator on health issues for Radio Monte Carlo.

Mario Pappagallo attended multiple conferences as keynote speaker and authored or co-authored several books (see below bibliography). Among them is Contro il dolore, an essay supporting pain treatment, written with his brother, the neurologist Marco Pappagallo.

== Awards ==
In 1989, the Italian Foreign Ministry awarded him a prize for a series of articles on the Italian health cooperation in Chad and Sudan.

In 2008, he was awarded the "August and Marie Krogh" Medal, Novo Nordisk Media Prize for the book Una carezza per guarire, Sperling & Kupfer, written with the oncologist Umberto Veronesi. In the same year, he won a journalistic prize sponsored by the Italian National Federation of Juvenile Diabetes.

In 2009, he gained the Novo Nordisk Italy Media Prize, in the category "Articles in lay press", for the article "The Diabetes Emergency". As winner of the Italy Media Prize, he has taken part in the Novo Nordisk International Media Prize 2009 contest for excellence in writing on diabetes, and he was the winner in the category "Best print article", first Italian journalist to win the international prize.

In the same year, he was awarded the "Pulcinella Prize" from Federdolore, the federation of pain management and palliative care specialists, for having treated "pain problems using accessible language".

== Bibliography ==
- (in Italian) Umberto Veronesi e Mario Pappagallo, Una carezza per guarire. La nuova medicina tra scienza e coscienza, Sperling & Kupfer, 2004, ISBN 88-200-3469-7
- (in Italian) Mario Pappagallo e Marco Pappagallo, Contro il dolore. I nuovi strumenti della medicina per non soffrire inutilmente: una battaglia civile, Frassinelli, 2005, ISBN 88-7684-888-6
- (in Italian) Umberto Veronesi e Mario Pappagallo, Le donne vogliono sapere. La prevenzione e le nuove cure per il tumore al seno, Sperling & Kupfer, 2006, ISBN 88-200-3919-2
- (in Italian) Lidia Rota Vender e Mario Pappagallo, Cuore di donna. Le scelte intelligenti per mantenerlo in forma, Sperling & Kupfer, 2007, ISBN 88-200-4235-5
- (in Italian) Mario Pappagallo e Umberto Solimene, Atlante delle Acque minerali, Lampi di stampa, 2008, ISBN 88-488-0817-4
- (in Italian) Umberto Veronesi e Mario Pappagallo, Verso la scelta vegetariana. Il tumore si previene anche a tavola, Giunti, 2011, ISBN 9788809766877
- (in Italian) Marco Squicciarini e Mario Pappagallo, Come salvare i bambini dal soffocamento, CFI Progetti s.r.l., 2011, ISBN 9788890642500
- (in Italian) Mario Pappagallo, Ancora in porto ancora. Aforismi e altri esercizi di stile, amarantoblook, 2012, ISBN 9788890709203
