= Robert Peckham (MP) =

English politician (died 1569)

Sir Robert Peckham (by 1516 – 10 September 1569) was an English politician. He sat as MP for Buckinghamshire in April 1554.

He was knighted on 2 October 1553.

== Family and education ==
He was the first son of Sir Edmund Peckham of Denham by Anne, the daughter of John Cheyne of Chesham Bois, Buckinghamshire. He was the brother of Henry Peckham (MP for Wycombe). He was admitted into Gray's Inn in 1533. c. 1537, he married Mary, the daughter of Edmund Braye, 1st Baron Braye.

== Political career ==
He also served as clerk comptroller of the counting house by 1540 till 1543; justice of the peace for Buckinghamshire from 1542 till 1547, quorum in 1558/59; commissioner of subsidy in 1543, commissioner of relief in 1550; escheator in Bedfordshire and Buckinghamshire from 1545 till 1546; sheriff from 1556 till 1557; member of the Privy Council from August 1553 till November 1558.
