= Toscano (cigar) =

Italian cigar manufactured in Tuscany

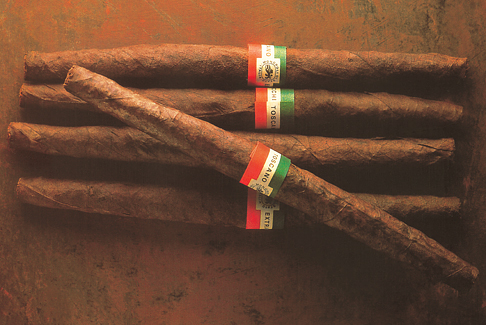
Some Toscano cigars.

The Toscano cigar is a brand of Italian cigars manufactured in Tuscany, Italy. They are made with fermented Kentucky tobacco. The brand was established in the late 19th century. It is an established brand in Italy and also in Switzerland and in Austria.

== History ==
In 1818, the Grand Duke of Tuscany, Ferdinand III, founded a tobacco factory that manufactured Toscano cigars. A bale of Kentucky tobacco leaves that had been drying in the open were caught in an unexpected downpour of rain. The wet tobacco started to ferment in the summer heat. It was decided that, instead of being thrown away, the fermented tobacco should be used to produce cigars to be sold in Florence. It gained popularity amongst Italians and thereafter became a regular production. Today, Toscano brand cigars are manufactured by Manifatture Sigaro Toscano SpA located in Lucca and Cava de' Tirreni.

== Shape ==
The Toscano cigar has a characteristic elliptical shape with truncated ends that have a smaller diameter than the central part (belly). The diameter of the cigar varies depending on the type of Toscano, from 13–16.5 mm (1/2–5/8 in). However, after a period of time, the thickness of certain types of cigars have been reduced by a few millimeters, decreasing its smoke time.

The lengths of various Toscano cigars are somewhat similar, ranging from 155–163 mm (6 3/32–6 13/32 in). The only exception is the Toscano "Il Moro" with a maximum thickness of 20 mm (13/16 in) and a length of 230 mm (9 1/16 in).

Typically, the Toscano cigar has an uneven, sometimes lumpy, surface, with noticeable ribs of the wrapping leaves. By the absence of a sub-band, and its processing not requiring shaping, these irregularities in structure are more evident in hand-rolled cigars and are seen as characteristics of the Toscano cigar.

== Production ==
The Toscano cigar is not a typical cigar as the Kentucky tobacco used in making it is generally a pipe tobacco. Kentucky tobacco is cultivated in various regions of Italy, such as Tuscany, Campania, Lazio, Umbria, and Veneto. For the wrapper, North American Kentucky leaves are used in various Toscano cigars because of their wider width. Kentucky leaves from Southern Italy, particularly Campania and Umbria, are used to attain certain flavors found in Toscano Garibaldi and Toscanello Garibaldi.

The tobacco leaves first undergo a type of wet fermentation, in which they are moistened and flame-cured in ovens fueled by oak and beech woods for a total of 15 to 20 days. During this stage, the leaves are arranged neatly onto strings in special cells equipped with a "Stendaggio" system and air valves for moisture regulation. Temperature regulation is controlled through the increase or decrease of wood fire. This whole process ensures that the Kentucky tobacco is completely cured. The tobacco, which is used as filler, is a blend of Italian traditionally-grown Kentucky and North American Kentucky. The flavoured Toscanello cigars use a filler blend of Italian, South American, and Far East Kentucky tobacco.

Unlike Caribbean cigars, where a binder is rolled around the filler tobacco before the wrapper tobacco covers it over, the Toscano cigar is made by rolling the filler tobacco with only the wrapper tobacco (without any binder). The production of cigars then continues on two lines: production by hand for high quality and limited edition cigars, and production by machine. In the production by hand, a cigar roller known as "sigaraia" produces up to 520 cigars per day. After rolling, the cigars are air-dried in an aging chamber. Depending on the duration of maturation, different qualities result. The cigars are placed in ventilated cells with controlled humidity levels. The aging period varies depending on the type of cigar. Some of the high-quality Toscano cigars are hand-rolled, such as the Toscano Il Moro, Toscano Il Presidente, Toscano Originale.

All Toscano cigars have a typical elliptical shape, similar to the "Perfecto" shape of a Caribbean cigar. Most Toscano cigars are between the length of 150 to 160 mm (5 7/8 to 6 5/16 in), with the exception of Il Moro, which has an average length of 230 mm (9 1/16 in). The Toscanello cigar is another variety of Toscano cigar, in which the cigars are already cut in half (ammezzati) and are ready to smoke. The classics are Toscanello, Toscanello Garibaldi, Toscanello Scelto, and Toscanello Speciale. As well as flavours such as Anise, Dark Chocolate, Espresso, Grappa, Mocha, and Vanilla.

== Characteristics ==
Toscano cigars have a high nicotine proportion. The varieties marketed may be marked by strength, sweetness and flavor. In the Toscano range, Toscano ExtraVecchio is said to be strong and determined. The Toscano production is characterized by purity and persistence of flavor.

Traditionally, they are not smoked as a whole, but cut in the middle. They are considered dry cigars or cheroots which means they do not have to be stored in a humidor. It is very much different from the Caribbean cigars which will dry up and crack if not stored in a humidor. The Kentucky tobacco is not hygroscopic after undergoing special fermentation and can be stored for years at room temperature without losing its quality. Ideally, the Toscano cigar should have an internal humidity between 12% and 14%, and a storage humidity of between 65% and 70%.

== Types of Toscano Cigar ==
The Toscano cigars are made and sold in 27 varieties:

* Toscano Originale	* Toscano Il Moro	* Toscanello Anice
* Toscano Originale 150	* Toscano Extravecchio	* Toscanello Caffe
* Toscano Originale Selected	* Toscano Classico	* Toscanello Fondente (Dark Chocolate)
* Toscano Originale Millennium	* Toscano Classico Vintage	* Toscanello Garibaldi
* Toscano Antica Riserva	* Toscano Garibaldi	* Toscanello Grappa
* Toscano Antica Tradizione	* Toscano Mascagni	* Toscanello Mocha
* Toscano Antico	* Toscano Modigliani	* Toscanello Scelto
* Toscano Anno Domini 1492	* Toscano Soldati	* Toscanello Speciale
* Toscano del Presidente	* Toscanello	* Toscanello Vanilla

Toscano Il Moro, handmade in limited quantities every year, is the only Toscano cigar which has its individual wooden packaging box. It is the most exclusive Toscano cigar and usually sold at a premium price. Other handmade Toscano cigars include Toscano Originale, Toscano Originale 150, Toscano Originale Selected, Toscano Millennium (limited edition), Toscano del Presidente (limited edition).

The Toscanello cigars are produced due to the popular custom of smoking Toscano cigars cut in half in Italy. Toscanello Garibaldi, Toscanello, and Toscanello Speciale are halves of Toscano Garibaldi, Toscano Classico, and Toscano Antico respectively. There is the Aroma series: Anice, Caffe, Fondente, Grappa, Mocha, and Vanilla which are lighter and more refreshing smoke.

The "Sigari d'Autore" series are based on three famous Italian personalities: Toscano Garibaldi (green box), Toscano Modigliani (white box) and Toscano Soldati (red box). When placed side by side, these three boxes form the Italian flag.

== In media ==
Toscano cigars appear in the film Anatomy of a Murder directed by Otto Preminger in 1959. The main character – a lawyer played by James Stewart – offered the cigars he was smoking to a friend and called them Italian cigars. The friend declines, saying, "Those stinkweeds are another sign of your decadence."

In the episode "The Bruce-Partington Plans" of Sherlock Holmes, produced by Granada Television in 1988, shows a scene at the Italian restaurant called Goldini. Holmes played by Jeremy Brett said to his friend and colleague, Dr. Watson played by Edward Hardwicke: "Try one of the proprietor's cigars. They are less poisonous than one would expect."

In the film The Band of Honest Men directed by Camillo Mastrocinque, having just finished printing the bank notes, Totò is seen buying a pack of Toscano cigars.

Clint Eastwood smoked Toscanos in the 1960s Spaghetti Westerns directed by Sergio Leone and scored by Ennio Morricone.

== See also ==
- Smoking in Italy

== Bibliography ==
- Testa, Francesco; Marconi, Aroldo (2001). The Toscano: The Complete Guide To The Italian Cigar (2 ed.). Florence: Giunti. ISBN 88-09-01651-3.
