= Edmund Peckham =

English royal official and politician (died 1564)

Sir Edmund Peckham (by 1495 – 29 March 1564) was an English royal official and politician. After rising through the financial offices of the royal household, he was appointed high treasurer of all the mints in England and Ireland in 1544 and held the post until his death, through the Great Debasement of the coinage and the reforms that reversed it. A Catholic who acted to secure the accession of Mary I in 1553, he sat as knight of the shire for Buckinghamshire in the Parliament of England in October 1553 and November 1554, and was a member of the Privy Council from 1553 to 1558.

== Family and early career ==
Peckham was born by 1495, the second son of Peter Peckham of London and Denham, Buckinghamshire, by his second wife Elizabeth, daughter of Henry Eburton of London. By 1516 he had married Anne, daughter of John Cheyne of Chesham Bois, Buckinghamshire; they had four sons and two daughters. The sons were Robert, Henry, George and Edward.

He was a clerk of the counting house when he attended Henry VIII at Gravelines in 1520, and rose through a succession of financial posts in the royal household: treasurer of the chamber from 1 May 1522 to 1 January 1524, and cofferer of the household from January 1524 until 31 March 1547. He was made a clerk of the green cloth in 1526, and in 1527 received a grant of manors out of the lands forfeited by Francis, Viscount Lovell. He was constable of Scarborough Castle in Yorkshire from 1529 to 1537, and a justice of the peace for Buckinghamshire from 1525 to 1543 and for Middlesex from 1537 to 1543. He was knighted on 18 May 1542.

== Treasurer of the mints ==
On 25 March 1544 Peckham became high treasurer of all the mints in England and Ireland, an office that carried with it a residence at Blackfriars and which he held until his death. He took it up at the beginning of the Great Debasement, and remained in post while that policy was carried to its conclusion and then reversed by the recoinages of Mary and Elizabeth I; his History of Parliament biographer ascribes this longevity to "integrity in business and neutralism in politics". In 1549 he was among those directed to restore the old standard of gold, and between 1552 and 1554 his place at the mint was filled temporarily by Martin Pirri, master of the Dublin mint.

Having accompanied Henry VIII to France in 1544, Peckham was named one of the assistant executors of the king's will and was left £200. He was brought on to the Privy Council during the political crisis of October 1549 but removed from it within the month, and took no further part in the politics of Edward VI's reign; as a Catholic and a friend and relation by marriage of Thomas Wriothesley, Earl of Southampton, he was estranged from those in power. He served on the commission for the relief in Buckinghamshire and Middlesex in 1550.

== Member of Parliament ==
In 1553 Peckham acted to frustrate the exclusion of Mary from the succession, joining a group of Buckinghamshire men who planned to move by way of Lord Paget's house at Drayton and seize the armoury at Westminster. He proclaimed Mary queen in Buckinghamshire and kept watch on the movements of the Duke of Northumberland in the eastern counties. He was granted an annuity of £60 for his service "at Framlingham", was sworn of the Privy Council by August, and on 1 December 1553 was appointed receiver-general of the Exchequer, becoming sole receiver of the queen's revenue under the reorganised revenue courts. His eldest son Robert joined Mary's Council before the end of the year.

Assessed in 1527 in the household on lands worth £126 a year, Peckham had consolidated his position at Denham, bought Biddlesden Abbey in north Buckinghamshire from Wriothesley and leased manors in Cheshire. His stake in the county and his standing at court brought him election as knight of the shire in Mary's first Parliament, in which, unlike his dissentient son Henry, he did not oppose the first steps towards the restoration of Catholicism, and carried two of the bills passed by the Commons up to the Lords. He and his son Henry took a prominent part in suppressing Wyatt's rebellion. His place was taken by his son Robert in the Parliament of April 1554, but he sat for the county again in November 1554, when he was not among those who left the Parliament early without leave. He was not returned in 1555 or 1558; Protestant influence appears to have prevailed in the Buckinghamshire elections, although his disappearance from the House may also have reflected Henry Peckham's complicity in the Dudley conspiracy. He was of the quorum for Buckinghamshire and Middlesex from 1554 until 1558 or 1559, and served on commissions for the goods of churches and fraternities in 1553 and for the subsidy in Buckinghamshire in 1558. In 1557 he attended the funeral of Anne of Cleves and acted as her executor.

== Later life and death ==
Under Elizabeth I, Peckham lost his seat on the Privy Council but was retained at the mint, where he helped to carry through the restoration of the coinage; his name appears on the pardon roll of the queen's first year. He made his will on 12 May 1563, asking that his "vile carcase" be buried without pomp. The only property named in it was the manor of Denham, left to his wife for life with remainder to his sons Robert and George, together with lands in Halse, Northamptonshire, and Croydon, Surrey, left to his sons as executors. He died on 29 March 1564 and was buried in Denham church on 18 April, where an elaborate monument was erected to his memory; by the end of the 19th century only damaged fragments of it remained. His widow was buried at Denham on 27 May 1570.
