= Susan Atefat-Peckham =

American poet

- Born: August 12, 1970; New York City
- Died: February 7, 2004 (aged 33); Jordan
- Education: Baylor University; University of Nebraska–Lincoln
- Occupation: Poet

Susan Atefat-Peckham (August 12, 1970, in New York City – February 7, 2004) was an Iranian-American poet.

== Life ==
She graduated from the Baylor University, and University of Nebraska–Lincoln with her PhD in 1999, where she was an Editorial Assistant for Prairie Schooner. She taught at the University of Nebraska–Lincoln, Hope College, where she was editor of Milkwood Review, and Georgia College & State University.

She and her son Cyrus were killed in an auto accident; her husband, Joel Peckham, mother, and youngest son Darius were hurt but survived.

== Poetry ==
- "Dates"; "AMEH JOON", Nebraska Center for Writers
- That Kind of Sleep. Coffee House Press. 2001. ISBN 978-1-56689-116-5.
- Deep Are These Distances Between Us. CavanKerry Press. 2023. ISBN 978-1-93388-096-9.
