= European Institute of Oncology =

European Institute of Oncology Hospital

Geography
- Location: Milan, Italy
- Coordinates: 45.414194°N 9.208118°E

Organisation
- Type: Research hospital

History
- Opened: January 1996

Links
- Website: www.ieo.it/en/
- Lists: Hospitals in Italy

The European Institute of Oncology (Italian: Istituto Europeo di Oncologia, IEO) is a non-profit private-law comprehensive cancer centre located in Milan, Italy. It serves as a clinic, a research centre, and a training institution. IEO is a member of EU-LIFE, an alliance of leading life science research centres in Europe.

The European Institute of Oncology works on the prevention, diagnosis and treatment of cancer by developing clinical and scientific research coupled with organisation and management. It provides a professional network for its members.

== History ==
The European Institute of Oncology was founded by Umberto Veronesi, who developed a new model for health and advanced research in the international oncology field. The institute was inaugurated in May 1994 and is currently managed by Division and Unit Directors from eight European countries.

The Institute became a research hospital and treatment centre (IRCCS or Istituto di Ricovero e Cura a Carattere Scientifico) through the Ministerial Decree issued in January 1996. The European Institute of Oncology provides services through agreements with Italy's National Health Service. Professor Gordon McVie performs outreach activities on behalf of the IEO.

The Institute integrates various activities involved in the fight against cancer: prevention and diagnosis, health education and training, research and treatment.

At its centre in Via Ripamonti all clinical, research and training activities take place. In 2002 the institute opened IEO CENTRO, an integrated cancer diagnosis centre in downtown Milan.

== Journal ==
ecancermedicalscience
- Discipline: Science
- Language: English, Spanish, Portuguese

Publication details
- History: 2007
- Open access: Yes

Standard abbreviations
- ISO 4: ecancermedicalscience

Indexing
- ISSN: 1754-6605

Links
- Journal homepage; Online access

ecancermedicalscience is the non-profit open-access journal of the European Institute of Oncology. Founded by Professors Umberto Veronesi and Gordon McVie in 2007, ecancermedicalscience is published by Cancer Intelligence and forms part of ecancer.org.

In 2014, Managing Editor Gordon McVie was accepted as a Scholar Member of the World Association of Medical Editors.

=== Business model ===
ecancermedicalscience is a non-profit journal supported by charitable funding. The key founding charities are The Umberto Veronesi Foundation, the European Institute of Oncology Foundation and Swiss Bridge.

In 2014, ecancermedicalscience became the first open-access journal to charge article fees based on a "pay what you can afford" model. Authors with access to publication funding may donate voluntarily to the journal to cover publication costs. Authors without access to funding do not have to pay any portion of the publishing costs.

=== In the news ===
In June 2014, a case report published in ecancermedicalscience received international media attention. The case report described a young Latin American girl whose fits of inappropriate laughter were mistakenly diagnosed as misbehavior or demonic possession, but were found to be Gelastic seizures caused by a brain tumor.

=== Abstracting and indexing ===
ecancermedicalscience is indexed in the following repositories:

- Google Scholar
- EMBASE
- PubMed/PubMed Central
- Scopus

=== Memberships ===
- Open Access Scholarly Publishers Association, of which ecancermedicalscience is a member
- Committee on Publication Ethics, of which ecancermedicalscience is a member.
