= Michael Peckham =

British oncologist (1935–2021)

Michael John Peckham (2 August 1935 – 13 August 2021) was a British oncologist and artist. As a cancer physician he is best known for his contribution to the treatment of testicular cancer. His paintings were first exhibited in 1962 and he showed in numerous mixed and solo exhibitions.

== Biography ==
He was born in Panteg, Monmouthshire, read Natural Sciences at St Catharine's College, Cambridge, and qualified as a doctor from UCL Medical School. He was called up for military service and spent two years as a captain in the Royal Army Medical Corps. He was married to Catherine Peckham, the daughter of Alexander King.

== Medicine and Science ==
After working with Maurice Tubiana at the Institut Gustave Roussy in Paris on the cell biology of lymphoma, he joined the Institute of Cancer Research and Royal Marsden Hospital in London. He was appointed to a Chair in 1973 and built up a team that specialised in testicular cancer and Hodgkin’s lymphoma. He founded the British Oncological Association in 1985, co-founded the European Society of Therapeutic Radiology and Oncology in 1981 and was a founder and first Chairman of the Federation of European Cancer Societies (FECS) which has since evolved into the European Cancer Organisation. He was Vice-Chair of the Imperial Cancer Research Fund (now Cancer Research UK) from 1986 to 1991.

In 1986 he became Director of the British Postgraduate Medical Federation, a school of the University of London comprising seven postgraduate medical institutes. In 1991 he became the first Director of Research and Development for the National Health Service (NHS) and Department of Health. Through the new programme the Cochrane Collaboration was launched and the basis laid for the National Institute for Clinical Excellence.

From 1997 to 2000 he was Director of the School of Public Policy at University College London. In 2000 he was appointed by the then Secretary of State for Education, David Blunkett, to chair the new National Educational Research Forum.

In 2000 he chaired the Foresight Panel "Healthcare in 2020" for the Department for Business, Innovation and Skills, Office of Science and Technology.

== Art ==
Michael Peckham's paintings were first shown at Bangor University in 1962. This was followed by an exhibition with William Gear in 1964 at the Bear Lane Gallery, Oxford. During the 1980s and 1990s he exhibited his work at the Christopher Hull Gallery. His solo exhibition at the Millinery Works Gallery opened on 11 September 2001. He exhibited with Richard Demarco in Edinburgh and showed work in 2001 in the Traveling Exhibition “70 over 2000: the Road to Meikle Seggie”. He worked with Richard Demarco to develop an artistic event at the centre of the European Conference on Clinical Oncology (ECCO) at the South Bank in London in 1989. “Death, Life, Regeneration” included work by Helen Chadwick, Joseph Beuys and Paul Neagu. The Cantata “Bavarian Gentians” commissioned for the occasion from Hugh Wood received its first performance conducted by Richard Hickox at this event.

The two aspects of his career came together when thirty five small drawings made in the clinical notes of his patients were shown in the Royal Academy Summer Exhibition in 2004 under the title “Treatments”.

A vivid account of the mutual influence of art and oncology in his work can be found in an essay published in the Lancet in 2017 "One Life".

=== Honours ===
- Knighted for services to medicine, 1995
- Doctor honoris causa, Université de Franche-Comté Besançon, 1991
- Hon DSc, Loughborough University of Technology, 1992
- Doctor honoris causa, Katholieke Universiteit Leuven, 1993
- Foreign associate member, National Academy of Sciences, Institute of Medicine Washington USA 1994
- Honorary Fellow, University College London, 1995
- Hon DSc, University of Exeter, 1996
- Honorary Fellow St Catharine’s College Cambridge, 1998
- Founding Fellow Academy of Medical Sciences, 1998
- Hon DSc (Medicine), University of London (Institute of Cancer Research), 2007
