= Joel Peckham =

American poet

Joel B. Peckham, Jr. is an American poet, scholar of American literature and a creative writer.

== Education ==
Peckham graduated from Middlebury College.

== Career ==
He has taught at the University of Nebraska–Lincoln, Hope College, and the Georgia Military College. He currently teaches at Marshall University.

He has worked as an editorial assistant for the Prairie Schooner, and is also co-founding editor of Milkwood Review.

His work has appeared in American Literature, Ascent, the Black Warrior Review, The Literary Review, The Malahat Review, The Mississippi Quarterly, the North American Review, Passages North, River Teeth, the Sycamore Review, The Southern Review, Texas Studies in Language and Literature, Under the Sun, and Yankee Magazine.

His work, out of the tradition of Neo-Romantic and Open-Form 20th Century Poets such as James Dickey and Allen Ginsberg employs a Whitmanesque line to explore the limits of empathy and communication in American Life.

== Personal life ==
In February, 2004, while on a Fulbright Scholarship to Jordan, Peckham was in an auto accident that took the lives of his wife, Susan Atefat Peckham, and his oldest son, Cyrus.

This tragedy led to his exploration of nonfiction prose as a means of expressing and critically engaging with the grief and recovery experience. His prose style is alternatively lyrical, raw, self-aware, and analytical in the tradition of writers like Viktor Frankl and C. S. Lewis.

He has since remarried and lives with his wife, Rachael, and son, Darius, in Huntington, WV.

== Awards ==
- Fulbright Scholar

== Works ==
- "Nightwalking", Valparaiso Poetry Review, Spring/Summer 2001
- Nightwalking. Pecan Grove Press. 2001. ISBN 978-1-877603-73-0.
- The Heat of What Comes. Pecan Grove Press. 2008. ISBN 978-1-931247-49-8.

=== Anthologies ===
- Robert Pack; Jay Parini, eds. (2002). Contemporary Poetry of New England. UPNE. ISBN 978-0-87451-966-2.
- Sam Hamill; Sally Anderson, eds. (2003). "Asleep at the Wheel". Poets Against the War. Thunder's Mouth Press. ISBN 978-1-56025-539-0.
