= Girolamo Sirchia =

Italian physician and politician

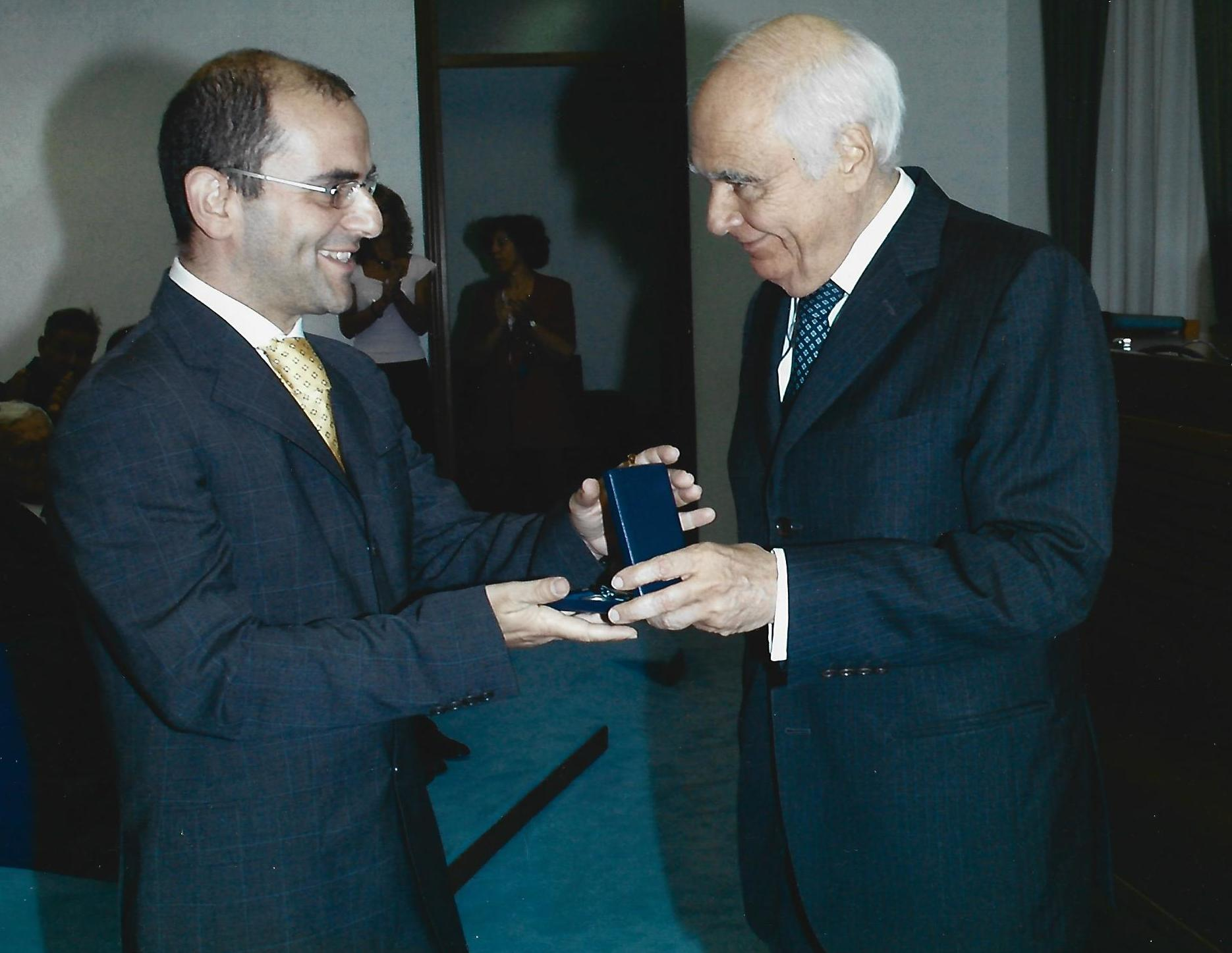
- Girolamo Sirchia with Alberto Pellai (left) in 2004.

Minister of Health
- In office 11 June 2001 – 23 April 2005
- Prime Minister: Silvio Berlusconi
- Preceded by: Umberto Veronesi
- Succeeded by: Francesco Storace

Personal details
- Born: 14 September 1933 (age 93) Milan, Italy
- Party: Independent
- Education: University of Milan
- Profession: Medic

Girolamo Sirchia (born 14 September 1933), is an Italian physician and politician.

== Biography ==
Sirchia was born in Milan. He is married and has two daughters. He obtained a medical degree at University of Milan, specializing in Internal Medicine and Immuno-hematology.

He was Italian Minister of Health from June 2001 to April 2005 and he is known first for a smoking ban (Sirchia law) in all indoor public places.

On 2 February 2005 he was investigated for corruption, after the suicide of his friend Francesco Mercuriali the previous 3 October.

On 17 April 2008 he was sentenced (first instance judgment) to three years of imprisonment for bribes in the world of health, plus five years of interdiction from public offices. Together with him the alleged corrupters were convicted, in particular of Haemonetics Italia. The sentence refers only to the accusations concerning events after 2000, while for the previous ones there was a prescription.

On 3 March 2010, the appeal ruling confirmed the embezzlement in relation to about 300,000 Swiss francs taken from the Il Sangue foundation of which he was treasurer, but acquitted him of the corruption charge. For a third charge, relating to $10,000 received from Japan's Kawasumi in December 2000, the judges finally declared the prescription; other disputes for which allegations of corruption were pending had already been declared prescribed during the first degree. The penalty was thus reduced to 5 months in prison and €600 fine: the Court of Appeal of Milan has therefore lifted the ban on public offices against Sirchia.

== See also ==
- List of smoking bans

== Sources ==
- Corriere della Sera. "A sei anni dalla legge Sirchia: Meno "bionde", ma fumatori stabili", 7 January 2011 (in Italian)
- La Repubblica. "Ministro della Sanità Girolamo Sirchia". 10 June 2001 (in Italian)
