= Umberto Veronesi =

Italian oncologist and politician (1925–2016)

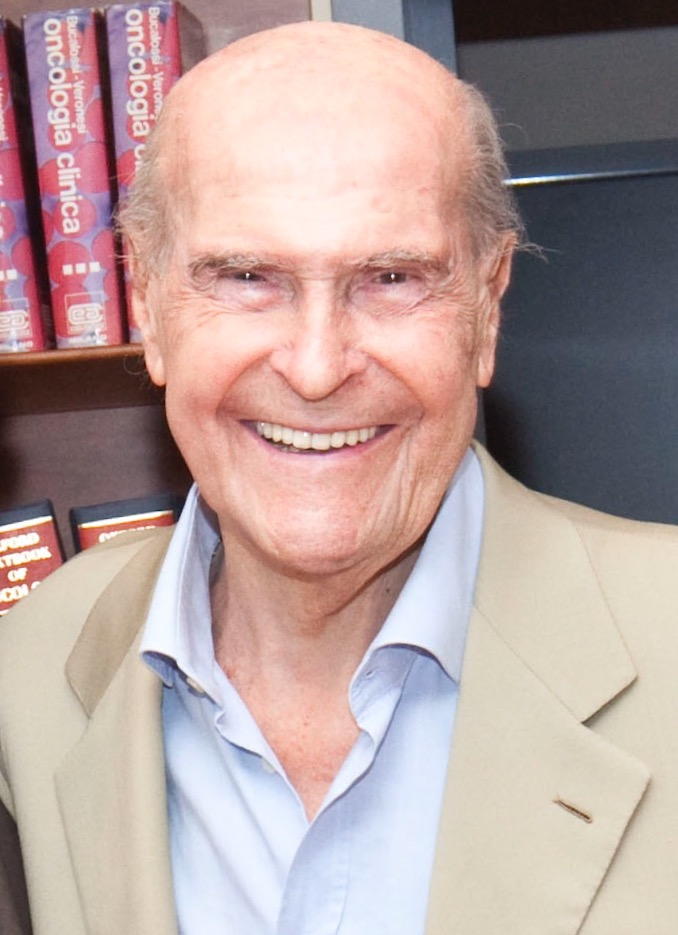
- Born: 28 November 1925; Milan, Kingdom of Italy
- Died: 8 November 2016 (aged 90); Milan, Italy
- Education: University of Milan
- Known for: Breast-conserving surgery in breast cancer treatment with the invention of the technique of quadrantectomy
- Scientific career
- Workplaces: European Institute of Oncology

President of the Italian Nuclear Safety Agency
- In office 5 November 2010 – 3 November 2011
- Preceded by: Office established
- Succeeded by: Office abolished

Member of the Senate of the Republic
- In office 29 April 2008 – 22 February 2011
- Constituency: Lombardy

Minister of Health
- In office 25 April 2000 – 11 June 2001
- Prime Minister: Giuliano Amato
- Preceded by: Rosy Bindi
- Succeeded by: Girolamo Sirchia

Personal details
- Party: PSI (till 1994); PD (2008–2011)
- Spouse: Sultana Susanna "Susy" Razon
- Children: 7
- Profession: Oncologist

Umberto Veronesi M.D. Knight Grand Cross OMRI (Italian pronunciation: [umˈbɛrto veroˈneːzi, -eːsi]; 28 November 1925 – 8 November 2016) was an Italian oncologist, physician, scientist, and politician, internationally known for his contributions on prevention and treatment of breast cancer throughout a career spanning over fifty years. He was the founder and president of the Umberto Veronesi Foundation. He also founded and held the role of scientific director and scientific director emeritus of the European Institute of Oncology. During his life and career, Veronesi was awarded a number of prizes for his contributions.

Veronesi was the scientific director of the National Cancer Institute in Milan from 1976 to 1994. His clinical and research activity focused on the prevention and treatment of cancer. In particular, he dealt with breast cancer, the leading cause of cancer death in women, (Note: See "Cancro della mammella". Università degli Studi di Firenze (in Italian). 2004. Archived from the original on 7 February 2008.) and was the first theorist and staunch proponent of quadrantectomy; he demonstrated how in the majority of cases the survival curves of this technique, provided it is combined with radiotherapy, are the same as those of mastectomy but with a better aesthetic and psychosexual impact. As a politician, Veronesi was Minister of Health from 2000 to 2001 and a member of the Senate of the Republic. He was also a supporter of civil rights, vegetarianism, and animal rights.

== Early life, family, and education ==
Veronesi was born in Milan on 28 November 1925. He grew up in via Vallazze, in Casoretto, in the then agricultural suburbs of Milan, with four older brothers and a younger sister. (Note: In 2002, about his family life, Veronesi wrote: "At home we spoke dialect. In the evening, in the large kitchen with the large fireplace, the only source of heat on cold days, my mother chanted the rosary and we all had to follow her. My father kept an old red flag. He had his ideas as a socialist like Turati, a reformist, which I inherited. And one day the squadristi arrived to teach him a lesson. But he was hiding in the fields and they left. A few years later, when I went into hiding, I too would have escaped. Fascists and Germans were hunting me, a tip alerted them that I was in the city. ... I was saved thanks to Angiolina, the concierge, who did a very courageous thing: she let them go up in the lift, then turned off the electricity ... . A year earlier, however, I had failed to escape from a minefield. ... It took eight operations to remove the splinters. All except one ... between the vena cava and the aorta, and I still carry it on me, making the detectors go off every time I pass the airport metal detectors." In 2010, Veronesi recalled: "My father was a tenant farmer from the Lombardy plain, we were outside Milan, although not very far away. We saw it as the great destination for those who live in the suburbs. So our great hope was to become 'citizens': he went to school walking 4–5 kilometers every morning, even in the middle of winter, with our shorts, with that naturalistic culture of the agricultural world. The conquest was slow, but it was very rewarding, like all great forms of emancipation.") Veronesi failed high school twice. (Note: In 2010, Veronesi wrote: "As a boy I saw myself as very ugly, I was convinced that girls couldn't even look at me, and I was sure that no one would ever fall in love with me. Maybe because I was really too tall for my age ... . And to vent this sense of inadequacy I acted like a brat and refused to study.") Given the early death of his father, the maternal figure of Erminia Verganti, to whom he dedicated the book Dell'amore e del dolore delle donne, was fundamental for him. (Note: In October 2010, Veronesi recalled: "My mother acted as my father, as my big sister, as my traveling companion, because I lost my father at 6 years old... a child needs guidance and my mother was the great guide, a deeply religious woman... she taught me two important things: one is tolerance... and the other is seeking the causes of events; if a person is hostile to you, don't just reject them or treat them badly: if they are hostile to you, there is a reason and you need to identify it.") Veronesi was born into a Catholic family and was also a practitioner but distanced himself from religion by the age of 14, becoming agnostic. He later declared that, after Auschwitz, the study of oncology had increasingly convinced him of the non-existence of God. In 2010, he said: "Religion, by definition, is fundamentalist, while science lives in doubt, in the search for truth." Veronesi obtained his professional degree in medicine and surgery from the University of Milan in 1951, and specialised in surgery in 1956 at the University of Pavia. Veronesi dedicated his professional life to the study and treatment of cancer.

== Scientific career ==
After spending brief periods in England and France, Veronesi joined the National Cancer Institute in Milan as a volunteer, and in 1975 became its director. Veronesi challenged the dominant paradigm among surgeons that cancer could only be treated with aggressive surgery. He championed a paradigm shift in cancer care from "maximum tolerated" to "minimum effective" treatment. In 1965, he participated in the foundation of the Italian Cancer Research Association and founded the European School of Oncology in 1982. He was also a founding member of the Italian Association of Medical Oncology. Among his numerous roles, there was that of president of the European Organisation for Research and Treatment of Cancer from 1985 to 1988. In 1991, he founded the European Institute of Oncology, becoming its scientific director; it was an innovative oncology hospital model based on the three principles of patient centrality, integration between laboratory research and clinical research, and prevention. The Umberto Veronesi Foundation for the progress of science, with the aim of supporting scientific research at a national level in oncology, cardiology, and neurosciences and promoting scientific dissemination, was established in 2003.

Veronesi's name is linked to scientific and cultural contributions recognised and appreciated throughout the world, the most relevant scientific contributions concerning the invention of conservative surgery for the treatment of breast tumors. A pioneer of breast-conserving surgery in early breast cancer as an alternative to a radical mastectomy, he developed the technique of quadrantectomy, which limits surgical resection to the affected quarter of the breast. Between 1973 and 1980, Veronesi led the first prospective randomised trial of breast-conserving surgery, known as the Milan I trial, which compared outcomes from radical mastectomy against quadrantectomy. The results, published in 1981, and confirmed in 2002 in a 20-year follow-up study, played a key role in establishing breast conserving surgery as the standard of care for patients with early breast cancer, alongside results from trials of lumpectomy led by the American breast surgeon Bernard Fisher. In June 2005, 1,800 surgeons called for Veronesi to be awarded a Nobel Prize for having revolutionised cancer treatment.

Veronesi, who was chairman of the BioGeM Scientific Committee and also a member of the boards of directors of Mondadori, (Note: See "Relazione del Consiglio di Amministrazione al 31 dicembre 2007" (PDF). Mondadori (in Italian). 4 April 2008. p. 5.) supported and promoted scientific research aimed at improving conservative surgical techniques, including sentinel lymph node biopsy, which resulted in axillary dissection in breast cancer with clinically negative lymph nodes no longer being performed. He contributed to breast cancer prevention conducting studies on tamoxifen and retinoids, and verifying their capabilities to prevent the formation of carcinoma. He was also an activist in anti-tobacco campaigns. In May 1994, the European Institute of Oncology was inaugurated and officially opened in January 1996; he was its director from 1994 to 2000 and from 2001 to 2014. In 2009, through his foundation, he started the project "Science for Peace", in order to promote peaceful relations through scientific development. In 2010, he was appointed president of the Scientific Committee of the Italy-USA Foundation. (Note: See "The Italy-USA Foundation commemorates Umberto Veronesi". Italy-USA Foundation. 8 November 2021. Archived from the original on 5 December 2023.) In 2012, some Italian websites reported that the institute led by Veronesi had purportedly certified the effectiveness of the Di Bella method, which he had already dismissed as part of the 1998 parliamentary commission and again in 2005; (Note: The Di Bella method was an alternative medicine therapy for the treatment of tumors. Created by the doctor Luigi Di Bella, there was no scientific evidence regarding its foundations and its effectiveness, and between 1997 and 1998 was the subject of significant attention from the Italian media. The then health minister Rosy Bindi stated many times that she was opposed to the experimentation because there was no evidence of its effectiveness. The experimentation conducted in 1999 by the Ministry of Health officially sanctioned the substantial inactivity, i.e. the therapeutic ineffectiveness, of what it called "the Di Bella multi-treatment", as did a letter in 2005 written by the then Superior Health Council president Mario Condorelli to the then health minister Francesco Storace. For an overview, see: Italian Study Group for the Di Bella Multitherapy Trials (23 January 1999). "Evaluation of an unconventional cancer treatment (the Di Bella multitherapy): results of phase II trials in Italy". BMJ. 318 (7178): 224–228. doi:10.1136/bmj.318.7178.224. ISSN 0959-8138. PMC 27702. PMID 9915729.; Milano, Gianna; Riccio, Mario (2008). Storia di una morte opportuna. Il diario del medico che ha fatto la volontà di Welby (in Italian). Milan: Sironi Editore. ISBN 978-88-5180-106-9 – via Google Books.; Di Grazia, Salvo (3 June 2011). "Dossier Di Bella: la sperimentazione (3)". MedBunker (in Italian).) the news proved to be a hoax and Veronesi described it as fake news and confirmed the ineffectiveness of the Di Bella method. (Note: For an example of such an article, including a retraction from Luigi Di Bella's son, Adolfo Di Bella, see "Veronesi Si Arrende A Di Bella: Somatostatina Efficace Contro Il Cancro (con Rettifica Di Adolfo Di Bella)". Associazione Toscana Sostegno Ammalati di Tumore. 8 April 2012. Archived from the original on 19 March 2015.)

== Political career ==
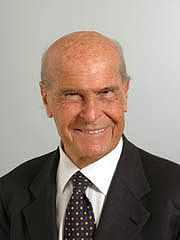
Veronesi's senatorial photo

During his early life, Veronesi shared his father's reformist socialist views and was close to the Italian Socialist Party (PSI). During the 1980s, he was called by the then PSI leader Bettino Craxi to be part of the party's national assembly. When the PSI was dissolved in 1994, he became an independent politician. In 1993 and 1998, after being appointed by the then health minister Raffaele Costa, he was respectively member of the National Commission Against Cancer to draw up a plan against tumor diseases and of the parliamentary commission for the evaluation of the Di Bella therapy against cancer. In 1995, he campaigned for drug liberalisation through the decriminalisation and legalisation of soft drugs, with the aim of achieving regulation of hemp derivatives, mainly for therapeutic use. On 25 April 2000, he was appointed to the Ministry of Health as part of the second Amato government, and was in office until 11 June 2001. Citing the health effects of tobacco, he was instrumental in the promotion of anti-smoking legislation in public places, calling for non-smokers to take to the streets with posters, hold marches, and occupy the Italian Parliament to have the law passed; the law was implemented by his successor Girolamo Sirchia. Under The Union banner, Veronesi was considered a candidate for mayor of Milan but this did not materialise.

In 2008, Veronesi was the successful main candidate in Milan for the Democratic Party (PD) to the Senate of the Republic. From 2010 to 2011, he was also chairman of Italy's Nuclear Safety Agency. After being appointed on 5 November 2010 as the head of the Italian Nuclear Safety Agency, Veronesi, who was a member of the 7th Public Education Commission on Cultural Heritage from 22 May 2008 to 22 February 2011, renounced to his senatorial seat in order to preside over the Nuclear Safety Agency. He was succeeded by Francesco Monaco. Later on 3 November 2011, Veronesi left the Nuclear Safety Agency, after announcing his resignation on 3 September 2011, in a controversy with the fourth Berlusconi government, complaining about the absence of headquarters, a formal appointment decree, and the minimum structures to allow the agency to begin and carry out its activities. His opposition to what he described as "the unjustified bogeyman" of nuclear power and his support for the usefulness and harmlessness of incineration earned him criticism from Beppe Grillo. (Note: Veronesi was in favour of incinerators as a solution to some problems related to waste disposal and supported their harmlessness to health. Beppe Grillo and other activists questioned Veronesi's statements, with Grillo arguing for a conflict of interest and claiming the existence of a sort of business for the benefit of the Cancer Institute, consisting in causing tumors and treating them. Veronesi responded to these criticisms with a letter. (Note: For his letter, see Veronesi, Umberto (14 May 2009). "Caro Beppe" (PDF) (in Italian). Archived from the original (PDF) on 22 July 2011 – via Il Blog di Beppe Grillo.) Some activists also argued that the partners of the Umberto Veronesi Foundation include companies that deal with incinerators and their construction, coal, fuel oil, and nuclear power plants. In addition to Enel, the companies involved are Acea and Veolia Environnement, which deal not only with water networks but also with incineration within the scope of energy production and waste treatment, respectively. These companies are among the twenty-three partners of the world conference The Future of Science, of which the Umberto Veronesi Foundation is one of the three organizing foundations, while they are not among the over one hundred partners of the organisation. For a list of the Umberto Veronesi Foundation's partners, see "Le aziende partner della Fondazione Veronesi". Umberto Veronesi Foundation. 2008. Archived from the original on 1 March 2008. Veronesi was in favour of nuclear power plants. In May 2007, he declared that, in order to respect the commitments made in the Kyoto Protocol and avoid sanctions for non-compliance, Italy should build ten nuclear power plants in ten years, exceeding what he called "the unjustified bogeyman" of atomic technology, with the justification that this source "does not pose risks to health and the environment". Carlo Rubbia, the 1984 winner of the Nobel Prize in Physics, disagreed with Veronesi. In 2008, Grillo referred to Veronesi as "Canceronesi" and wrote: "For him incinerators and the tumor institute are a virtuous cycle of disease creation. A business. It causes it and cures it." Years later, when Grillo expressed his support for the need of greater transparency in regards to the rules concerning the relationship between TV and the pharmaceutical industry, he gave the example of Veronesi, saying that "advertise mammograms on TV like this, probably, he has grants for his institute.") For the 2012 Italian centre-left primary election, he said that he was inclined to vote for the left-wing candidate Nichi Vendola of Left Ecology Freedom (SEL). In the 2016 Milan municipal election, he expressed his support for the centre-left coalition candidate and eventual winner Giuseppe Sala.

== Personal life and death ==
Veronesi was married to Sultana Susanna "Susy" Razon, a pediatrician of Jewish faith and Turkish origins who had survived the Nazi concentration camps. Together, they had seven children (five boys and two girls), two of whom, Paolo and Giulia, followed in his footsteps and are surgeons, while a third, Alberto Veronesi, is an orchestra director. Veronesi died in his home in Milan on 8 November 2016, aged 90. Many politicians and public figures, including the incumbent Italian president Sergio Mattarella, the then Italian prime minister Matteo Renzi, the then health minister Beatrice Lorenzin, the then Chamber of Deputies president Laura Boldrini, the then Senate of the Republic president Pietro Grasso, the then Lombardy president Roberto Maroni, and Milan mayor Giuseppe Sala, paid tributes to him. (Note: In his statement commemorating Veronesi, Sergio Mattarella said: "We must continue on the path of research, picking up Veronesi's baton and the teaching he left to young doctors: 'Continue searching until the end, with the awareness that you cannot do except good and life.' Veronesi has always combined his professional commitment with a civil passion and a consistent willingness to build, together with others, the common good. When called upon, he carried out important public roles with intelligence and sensitivity, up to the Minister of Health, and has always fought, with tenacity, to expand high-level study and research activity in our country, giving life to voluntary associations and foundations aimed at great social objectives, such as cancer research. Umberto Veronesi gave honour to Italy and the Republic pays homage to him, in the belief that others follow and will follow the path he has undertaken to achieve new results of progress, also thanks to his work and his intuitions." During a demonstration in La Spezia, Matteo Renzi announced Veronesi's death and invited the audience to applaud. Renzi said: "He was a witness to the 'yes', but beyond this, he was a great man for healthcare. I would like you to remember him with a big round of applause." Renzi also tweeted: "I remember Umberto Veronesi, a great Italian." Beatrice Lorenzin tweeted: "Goodbye to Umberto Veronesi, a great scientist and man of value, who taught women how to win and protect themselves from cancer. An affectionate hug to his loved ones." Laura Boldrini tweeted: "Thanks to him we no longer talk about incurable disease. Umberto #Veronesi was able to give many #men and #women new hopes of life." Pietro Grasso tweeted: "A life dedicated to the fight against tumors, a great doctor, and a free man. We will miss the science and reflections of #Veronesi." Roberto Maroni stated: "I feel great pain at the passing of Professor Umberto Veronesi, a giant of modern medicine who fought evil. Bye Umberto, rest in peace." Giuseppe Sala commented: "Milan and Italy mourn Umberto Veronesi. Doctor, scientist, and man with a strong civic passion. It's up to everyone now to continue on his way.") The secular funeral took place at Palazzo Marino in the presence of Sala and many ordinary people; his son Alberto honoured him with two musical pieces by Ludwig van Beethoven and Giacomo Puccini. After the funeral, his body was cremated.

== Activism and political campaigns ==
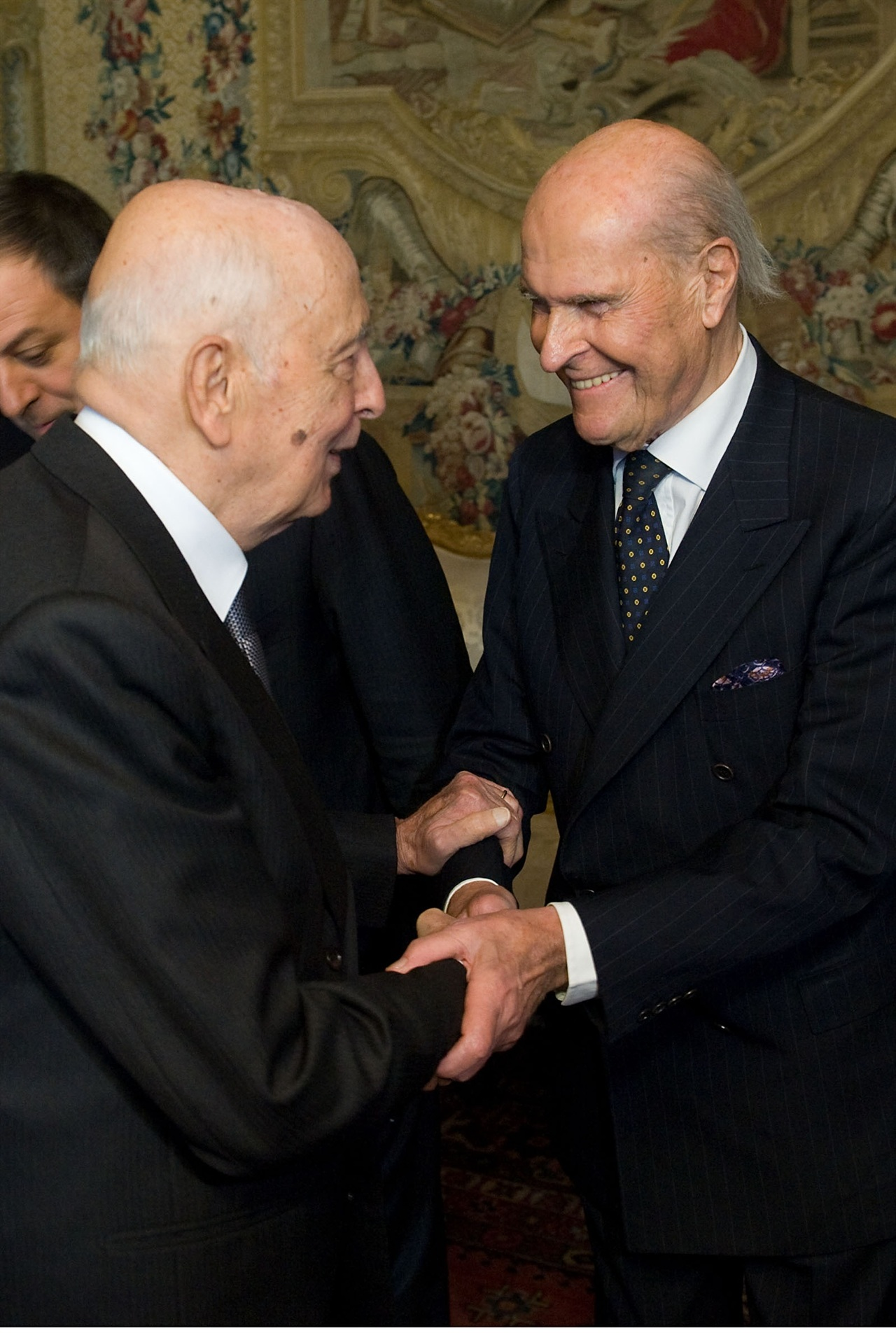
Veronesi with Giorgio Napolitano

Among the various campaigns promoted by Veronesi was that in 1995 for the decriminalisation and regulation of soft drugs and hemp derivates, especially for its therapeutic uses in the field of pain therapy. He argued that legalisation had positive effects, citing the liberal drug policy of Switzerland as having decreased the number of drug addicts. (Note: For an article of his in support of cannabis legalisation, see Veronesi, Umberto (7 August 2014). "Diciamo anche noi marijuana libera". L'Espresso (in Italian). Archived from the original on 24 March 2023.) He was part of the guarantors of the Liberta e Giustizia association, which acts in defense of the secular state and the balance between powers. He was in favour of genetically modified organisms (GMOs). In March 2005, on the occasion of a conference on environmental communication, Veronesi mentioned the toxins contained in certain foods, for example polenta, potatoes, flour, or basil. This statement, which was widely reported in the Italian press, including Corriere della Sera, Il Giornale, Il Giorno, Il Messaggero, La Repubblica, Il Secolo XIX, and La Stampa, provoked indignation from slow food, organic food growers, and movements against the legalisation of GMOs, including Beppe Grillo. On 11 December 2006, on the occasion of the awarding of the honorary degree in Agricultural Sciences and Technologies at the University of Naples Federico II, Veronesi reiterated that "genetic engineering is not a magic wand for solving the problems of humanity, but it is an extremely intelligent method to fight world hunger, to reduce the impact of pesticides, to combat desertification."

In 2008, Veronesi declared that he was in principle against telephone tapping. He was also against the death penalty and life imprisonment, and carried out an abolitionist campaign with the Science for Peace association, stating that "our system of neurons is not immutable but is renewed because the brain is equipped with stem cells capable of generating new cells. So the person we locked up in prison is not the same twenty years later. For every man there is the possibility to change and evolve. Secondly, DNA studies demonstrate that violence is not a biological imperative. On the contrary, the message of our genetic code is the perpetuation of the species, a natural predisposition to solidarity." In 2009, Veronesi became ambassador of the Internet for Peace movement, which was founded by Wired Italia with the aim of nominating the Internet for the Nobel Peace Prize in 2010. (Note: See "Sign up for the Internet for Peace and become part of the movement to nominate the Net for the Nobel Prize". Internet for Peace. 2009. Archived from the original on 20 November 2009. "We have finally realized that the Internet is much more than a network of computers. It is an endless web of people. Men and women from every corner of the globe are connecting to one another, thanks to the biggest social interface ever known to humanity. Digital culture has laid the foundations for a new kind of society. And this society is advancing dialogue, debate and consensus through communication. Because democracy has always flourished where there is openness, acceptance, discussion and participation. And contact with others has always been the most effective antidote against hatred and conflict. That's why the Internet is a tool for peace. That's why anyone who uses it can sow the seeds of non-violence. And that's why the next Nobel Peace Prize should go to the Net. A Nobel for each and every one of us.") That same year, through the Umberto Veronesi Foundation, he also launched the Science for Peace project, an international peace movement led by personalities from the scientific world, including several Nobel Prize winners. (Note: See "Fondazione Umberto Veronesi per il progresso delle Scienze". Fondazione Umberto Veronesi (in Italian). 2009. Archived from the original on 27 September 2010. "Science for Peace è un progetto nato su iniziativa di Umberto Veronesi che si pone come obiettivo la nascita di un grande movimento per la pace alla cui guida vede impegnato il mondo della scienza. Hanno risposto all'appello di Umberto Veronesi molti scienziati, Premi Nobel e personalità illustri della cultura internazionale." [Science for Peace is a project born on the initiative of Umberto Veronesi which aims to create a great peace movement led by the world of science. Many scientists, Nobel Prize winners, and illustrious personalities of international culture responded to Umberto Veronesi's appeal.] "Science for Peace". Fondazione Umberto Veronesi (in Italian). 2013. Archived from the original on 27 August 2016. "Il progetto, nato su iniziativa di Umberto Veronesi nel 2009, si è posto due obiettivi di altissimo respiro, condivisi dai protagonisti della scienza, della cultura, dell'economia, della società che vi hanno aderito: 1. Diffusione della cultura di pace e superamento di tensioni tra gli Stati. Vogliamo promuovere una cultura di non violenza educando alla pace. A partire dai più giovani, nelle scuole, nelle università, nella società civile, ma non solo. 2. Riduzione degli ordigni nucleari e delle spese militari a favore di maggiori investimenti alla ricerca e allo sviluppo. Perché siamo convinti che sia necessario ridurre gli investimenti militari e destinare maggiori risorse alla ricerca e a concreti progetti di pace." [The project, born on the initiative of Umberto Veronesi in 2009, has set two very high-level objectives, shared by the protagonists of science, culture, economy and society who have joined it: 1. Spreading the culture of peace and overcoming tensions between states. We want to promote a culture of non-violence by educating for peace. Starting from the youngest, in schools, universities, civil society, but not only. 2. Reduction of nuclear weapons and military spending in favor of greater investments in research and development Because we are convinced that it is necessary to reduce military investments and allocate greater resources to research and concrete peace projects.]) The aim was to address the root causes of conflicts and inequalities with a scientific approach and propose concrete solutions to overcome them. In this regard, Veronesi, who defined himself as "an extremist pacifist", stated: "I started the movement for universal peace, but in the Tolstoyan sense, peace not as the absence of war, or not only as the absence of war, but as a return to a natural, peaceful, profound condition of our thinking. So we are fighting for peace in the world, against wars, against weapons, against abuses of power, against violence, against the death penalty, in favour of women whose identity is trampled upon in many countries. And therefore we could say that it is a great movement for non-violence."

== Ethical views ==
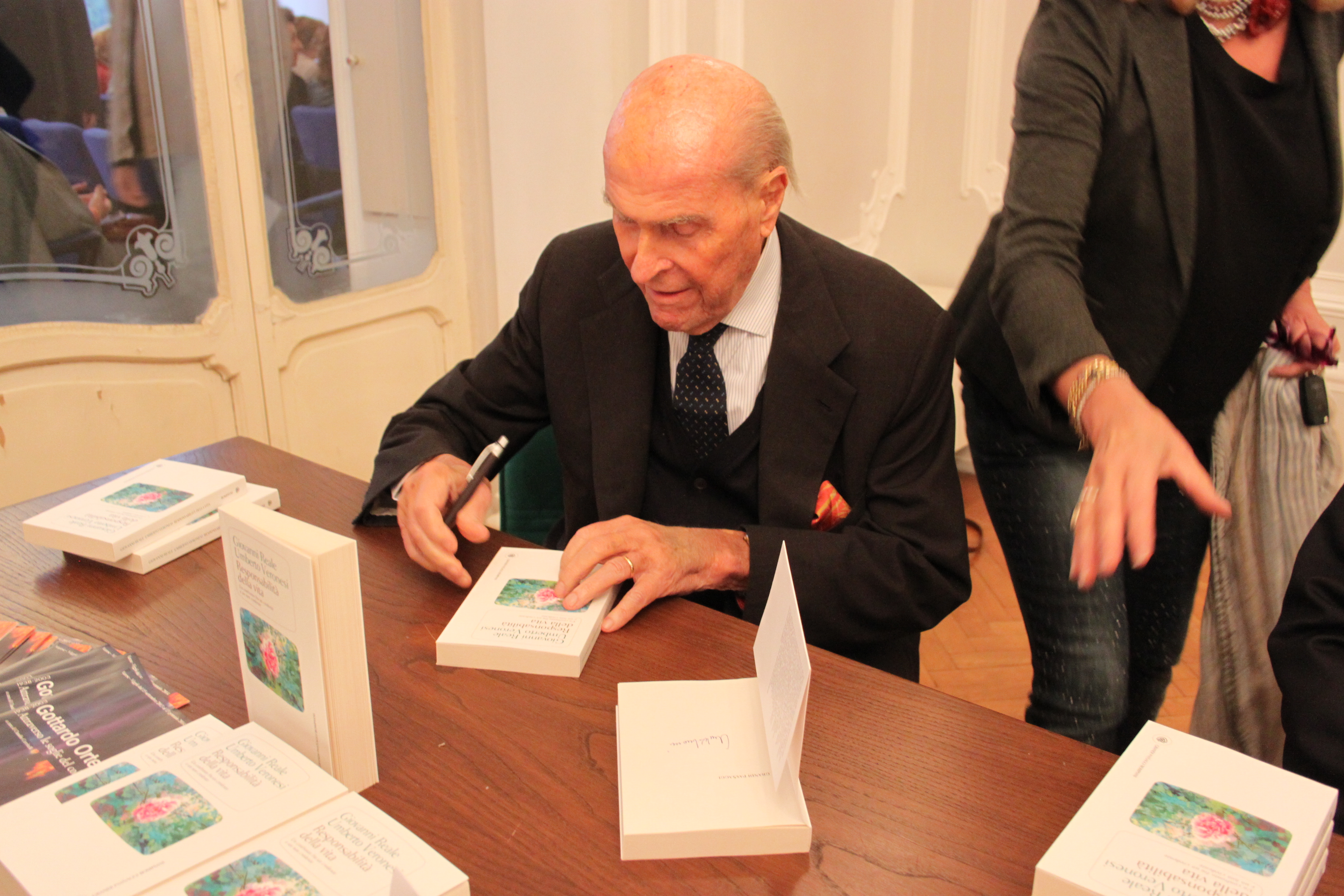
Veronesi signing one of his books

Over the years, Veronesi publicly expressed his views on several ethical and bioethical issues in interviews, televised debates, and his books, and was known for his support of civil rights. He was opposed in principle to a doctors' strike, saying: "It is a legitimate instrument of struggle ... but, in my opinion, not for those doctors who work in hospitals." In 1981, he was threatened with death by the Red Brigades. (Note: In 2002, Veronesi recalled: "A few days after the killing of the medical director of the Luigi Marangoni Polyclinic ... I found the secretaries in tears. They made me read a threatening letter with a five-pointed star: 'You are a walking corpse.' I went to the police station to ask what I should do. 'We can't give you escorts, but only advice. Never go out at the same time, change your phone number, change your home if you can or, at least, don't always go to sleep in the same place. Live irregularly. ...' So I did for some time. The irritating thing was that every night the phone rang, first around one, then two, three, and so on until dawn. ... At the police station they insisted that I change my number. I did so, but the next day the late-night phone calls resumed. I changed the phone a second time and again the phone rang again. I told the police station and they told me that there were moles infiltrated everywhere. I had a strange time. I felt a bizarre sense of adventure because my existence had been turned upside down in terms of habits, schedules, and work. I must say that I accepted things without making a fuss about it.") Veronesi identified himself as an agnostic, not believing in any form of afterlife. He argued that human beings should not consider death a terrifying moment but rather accept it as a biological necessity. Veronesi supported active euthanasia, affirming the right of any individual to end their life if it became unbearable due to suffering or loss of dignity. He advocated the necessity to regulate euthanasia at a national level, citing the Dutch euthanasia legislation as a good starting point; (Note: In 2005, Veronesi wrote the book Il diritto di morire. La libertà del laico di fronte alla sofferenza (The Right to Die: The Freedom of the Lay in the Face of Suffering). An honorary member of the Libera Uscita association for the decriminalisation of euthanasia, he stated: "But I am even more convinced that, in order not to reach euthanasia, whether passive or active, there is a fundamental objective to be achieved: to prevent the desire for death by doing everything possible to ensure that the patient, in particular the terminally ill, does not reach to such a state of suffering. If it is treated well, the patient rarely asks to die. If he is cared for with affection, with love, without pain, he will not ask for a good death." In 2013, together with the Catholic philosopher Giovanni Reale, he published the book Responsabilità della vita. Un confronto fra un credente e un non credente (A Comparison Between a Believer and a Non-Believer). Starting from antithetical conceptions, a convergence of opposing views is manifested on the topic of therapeutic non-aggressiveness; according to Veronesi, it is based on the freedom of each individual and the right to decide freely for themselves and of one's own body, while Reale stated that life is a right unavailable to suicide and murder but unavailable also towards "therapeutic fury and invasive techniques at the end of life" when true life has now ceased to be. In 2014, Veronesi was among the signers of a pro-euthanasia petition asking for "a death with dignity".) Veronesi promoted a campaign for the introduction of living will as a legally binding agreement between the doctor and the incapacitated patient. (Note: For his promotion of informed consent and a living will, see Veronesi, Umberto (2010). Dell'amore e del dolore delle donne (in Italian). Turin: Einaudi. p. 34. ISBN 978-88-06-20133-3 – via Internet Archive.) He was also in favour of egalitarian marriage and LGBT adoption. (Note: Veronesi said that he was in favour of both same-sex marriage and adoption by same-sex couples, supporting total equality between heterosexual and homosexual couples. He also argued that homosexual love is the purest, as it is not aimed solely at procreation.)

Veronesi was personally opposed to abortion, describing it as "a dramatic and traumatic event that everyone would like to avoid", but was equally opposed to anti-abortion laws, and supported the legalisation of abortion to protect "those who find themselves facing it", as he argued that criminalisation does not stop abortions and that in fact the abortion law in Italy had reduced the number of abortions, as well as contraception pills, which he also advocated to reduce ovarian cancer, and mifepristone. (Note: In 2008, Veronesi wrote: "The fight against a great evil (abortion) if it is fought with an unsuitable measure (prohibition) leads to an even greater evil (i.e. the clandestinity of abortive practices with the relative serious consequences), while the analysis of the causes that they are at the origin of evil and their removal leads to the correct measure: to prevent it from happening. The solution to evil lies in its prevention." In 2010, he reiterated: "Yet I am against abortion. We all are, I believe: there is no person who is not ideally against the termination of a pregnancy because it is an act against nature (in the sense that it is opposed to the genetic imperative of reproduction ... ) and because it produces traumatic consequences from a psychological point of view. But condemning abortion with a law, making it illegal, does not prevent abortions from taking place. ... Voluntary abortion is a serious event, but clandestine abortion is a tragedy: for this reason offering a woman the opportunity to have an abortion in a legal and controlled way corresponds to the choice of the 'lesser evil'. And then, within this lesser evil, the modality of the RU486 pill – which I have supported since from the first hints of the possibility of its introduction in Italy – it is the best choice because it is the least painful for the woman.") Veronesi supported the moral and intellectual superiority of women over men. He wrote that "a woman's greatness is instinctive and complete, a genetic greatness because it is based on a combination of DNA, and mental characteristics, which leads to a better ability to adapt". In his opinion, women would be more resistant to pain and fatigue, more loyal to the company or institution they represent, less aggressive, more decisive, and more devoted to harmony, peace, and civil progress.

Veronesi was an ethical vegetarian and an animal rights advocate. (Note: In the book Una carezza per guarire (A Caress to Heal), Veronesi dedicated its last chapter to the theme of animal experimentation. Like the Australian philosopher Peter Singer, Veronesi expressed his hope for the evolution of an anti-speciesist ethical attitude. Considering that various research methods that do not use animals have been gradually developed, Veronesi argued that the still widespread use of laboratory guinea pigs is unjustified, especially for experiments that would give little contribution to scientific progress; from this, he recalled the urgency of legislation regarding animal testing in order to increasingly limit to a minimum, thanks to the use of alternative techniques, the use of laboratory animals and because large animals, such as primates, dogs, and cats, are completely excluded from experimental practices. According to Veronesi, the path of a new ethic aimed at respecting animals does not stop at the drastic reduction of medical experiments on them. Regarding the conditions of farm animals, he wondered how anyone who is sensitive to the suffering of laboratory guinea pigs can remain insensitive to the cruel treatment reserved for slaughter animals, who are considered mere productive machines for the transformation from one commodity (feed) into another (meat) and destined to die by bleeding so that their flesh takes on the common white colour. He also argued that the same people who sign petitions against vivisection but still eat meat do not realise their inconsistency in financing the killing of many other animals. To the objection that the pain of an animal cannot be compared to that of a man, given the complex neuropsychic and affective-social structure that humans have unlike animals, Veronesi stated that animal rights supporters respond by observing how the level of psychic processing of suffering is also reduced in the cases of mentally-disabled, brain-damaged, or simply newborn human beings but that no good-hearted person would consider it ethical to kill or use them for experiments, given that they possess a nervous system and therefore they experience sensations of joy and pain. About plants, Veronesi said that they do not have a nervous system, therefore they do not suffer and for this reason vegetarians prefer to eat exclusively plant foods to avoid causing unnecessary suffering. To the other frequent objection of those who deny animal rights, according to which all animals are aggressive towards each other and therefore man simply follows natural law in imposing his strength on other species, he replied that human beings can very well correct a natural law that it deems unjust since it involves the infliction of unnecessary suffering by one species on another, and that the characterizing trait of man, compared to other animals, is in ethics and in freely rejecting those behaviors that are considered contrary to conscience.) He was a vegetarian for ethical reasons but also promoted the health benefits of a lacto-ovo vegetarian diet. (Note: Veronesi argued that meat is not an indispensable food for human nutrition, and that the vegetarian diet, which he himself followed, helps prevent the onset of serious diseases, including intestinal cancer. He said: "Our organism, like that of monkeys, is programmed precisely for the consumption of fruit, vegetables, and legumes. A meat-free diet would certainly not weaken us: think of the physical power of the gorilla. And let's think of the newborn, who in the first months quadruples his weight by feeding only on milk. Not only would a diet of fruit and vegetables be good for us, but it would actually help keep diseases away." Veronesi clarified that he was a vegetarian, and had been so for a long time, not for health reasons but by virtue of ethical reasons. He said: "I am a vegetarian for ethical and non-medical reasons. Animals must be respected and not killed and then eaten. All animals." For Veronesi, the health motivation gives even more value to a choice that is first of all ethical, since it is aroused by compassion for the suffering suffered by animals, to which is also added, as a third motivation of further strengthening stimulus, the discovery of the what he called the Third World value of vegetarian choice. Veronesi explained: "For me, giving up meat is also a form of solidarity and social responsibility. In a world that is hungry, the consumption of meat constitutes an enormous waste: if over 820 million people suffer from hunger it is also because a large part of the arable land is reserved for fodder for meat animals. Agricultural products worldwide could be enough to feed everyone, if they were not largely used to feed farm animals." According to Veronesi, uncontrolled meat production risks depriving the Earth of drinking water and energy sources, as he denounced in an interview shortly after being elected senator. He said: "Humanity risks a destructive chain effect: depletion of energy, drinking water, basic foods to satisfy incorrect food consumerism. ... The math doesn't add up. Six billion inhabitants, three billion cattle for slaughter (each kilo of meat burns 20 thousand liters of water), 15 billion birds for food, production of fuel from cereals. Soon there will be no more food. Wheat, soya, rice, and corn cost more and more, and feed farm animals. We must stop now." In his book Longevità (Longevity), Veronesi wrote: "Beyond ethical, philosophical, and environmental protection decisions, I believe that looking after one's health is a sufficient reason to rethink meat consumption." For Veronesi, vegetarianism has ethical, health, social, and environmental value. Together with other ethical efforts, such as the progressive setting aside of animal testing and practices like rodent control, vegetarianism represents a useful element in the establishment of a new relationship, which would thus no longer be anthropocentric but rather solidarity, between man and nature. While not denying that other structures belonging to the European Institute of Oncology he founded carry out experiments on animals in the context of basic research, Veronesi declared that "no animals are used". He clarified that he considered experimentation on animals as equally necessary as that on humans, and that both must be subject to the same basic ethical constraints. Speaking about the new European Institute of Oncology alongside the one already active, he also declared that "we would like our patients to all become vegetarians because this institute must also have an educational function" and "we must also give the example of proper nutrition".) In 2012, Veronesi co-authored Verso la scelta vegetariana (Towards the Vegetarian Choice) with Mario Pappagallo. The book included 200 vegetarian recipes. Veronesi supported GMOs as a way to produce food with higher nutritional capabilities and deprived of potentially carcinogenic substances. He criticised the opposition to GMOs as being due to a lack of scientific knowledge. During a public conference in 2005, Veronesi stated that some toxins contained in particular foods caused cancer rather than GMOs, a statement that sparked criticism and various controversies from the slow food movement, among others. In a 2006 statement, he further underlined how GMOs can be used to fight world hunger, reduce the impact of pesticides, and combat desertification.

== Awards ==
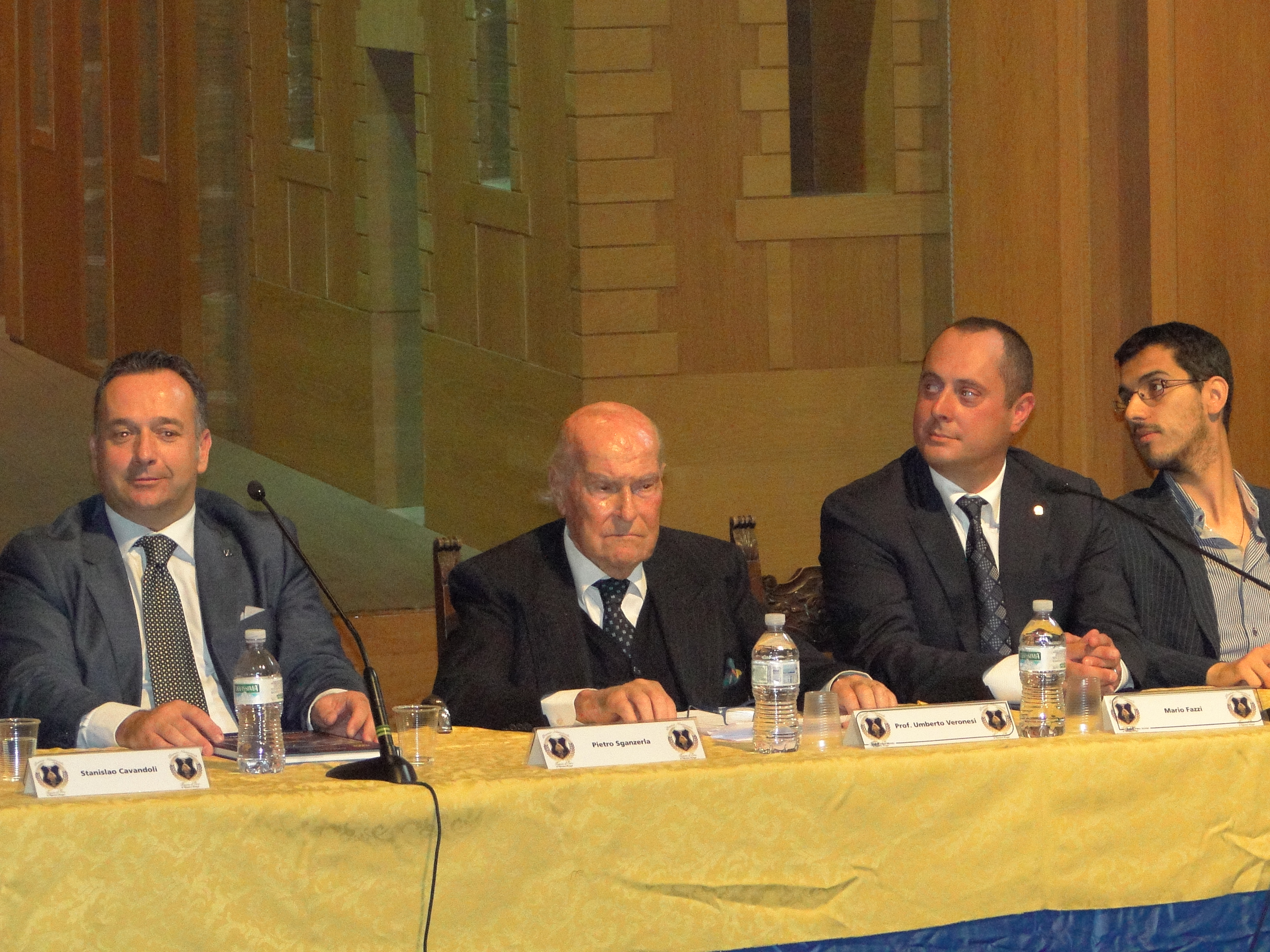
Veronesi at the ceremony awarding him the Toson d'Oro in 2014

Veronesi received thirteen national and international honorary degrees in medicine, medical biotechnologies, agricultural sciences, pedagogical sciences, and physics. (Note: See "Lauree honoris causa – Umberto Veronesi – Laurea honoris causa in Fisica –15 marzo 2005". Università degli Studi di Milano-Bicocca (in Italian). 3 August 2017. Archived from the original on 2 April 2018. "Per il contributo fondamentale dato alla fisica sanitaria in Italia, con particolare riferimento alla sua pionieristica attività nel settore della chirurgia laser e nello sviluppo di tecniche avanzate ed innovative per la terapia antitumorale con fasci di particelle ionizzanti." [For the fundamental contribution given to health physics in Italy, with particular reference to his pioneering activity in the sector of laser surgery and in the development of advanced and innovative techniques for anti-tumor therapy with ionizing particle beams.]) On 8 November 1974, he was awarded the gold medal for Merit in Public Health. (Note: See "Veronesi Prof. Umberto – Cavaliere di Gran Croce Ordine al Merito della Repubblica Italiana". Quirinale (in Italian). 2021.) On 5 January 1982, he was made Grand Knight of the Order of Merit of the Italian Republic. (Note: See "Veronesi Prof. Umberto – Medaglia d'oro al merito della sanità pubblica". Quirinale (in Italian). 2021.) In 1983, he was awarded the Minerva Anna Maria Mammoliti Men's Award "for his commitment to research against women's cancers". (Note: See "Premio Minerva 1983". Minerva Online (in Italian). 2020. Archived from the original on 5 August 2020.) In 2002, Veronesi received the King Faisal International Prize. In this regard, he stated: "In recent years, I have been increasingly involved in curing Islamic women. They started to come to me and undergo surgery at the European Institute of Oncology after I received in 2002 in Saudi Arabia the King Faisal International Prize for my studies on conservative breast surgery. As a matter of fact, for the Islamic world that recognition is a kind of Nobel."

Veronesi became an honorary citizen of several cities, including Asti on 31 January 2004, Monte Argentario in 2006, and Inveruno in 2015. In 2009, he received the America Prize of the Italy–USA Foundation. On 2 August 2010, a piece of beachfront at Jesolo Beach was named after him. In 2012, he received the Art, Science and Peace Prize for his career. (Note: For an overview, his letter accepting the award, and his speech, see "Veronesi conferma premio" (PDF). Centro dell'Uomo (in Italian). 12 July 2012. Archived (PDF) from the original on 7 December 2016. "Professor Umberto Veronesi's Speech for the award of the 'Art, Science and Peace Prize'" (PDF). Centro Interreligioso Mondiale (in Italian). 2 August 2012. "Premio Arte Scienza e Pace. Bocelli, Veronesi, Zeffirelli, Pivano". Centro dell'Uomo (in Italian). 18 April 2024.) In 2014, Veronesi won the inaugural Vespasiano Gonzaga National Golden Fleece Award, which is intended for those who "exceptionally honoured society without limits of age, nationality, sex, rank, profession and political or religious affiliation", (Note: See "National Gold Toson Award". Visit Sabbioneta. 27 October 2023.) for "the extraordinary scientific contributions provided to oncology research, prevention, diagnosis and treatment of tumors". (Note: See "Premio Nazionale Toson d'Oro di Vespasiano Gonzaga – Prima Edizione – 2014 – Umberto Veronesi". Toson d'Oro (in Italian). 2014. Archived from the original on 29 April 2024.) In March 2017, the European School of Oncology, of which he was the founder, named after him the Umberto Veronesi Memorial Award, a biennial award given to researchers who contribute to the advancement of research in the treatment of breast cancer. (Note: See "Umberto Veronesi Memorial Award 2017". Istituto Europeo di Oncologia. 15 March 2017. "Veronesi Memorial Award". European School of Oncology. 15 March 2017. "Fondazione Umberto Veronesi Award: chi sono i vincitori del 2023". Fondazione Umberto Veronesi (in Italian). 30 May 2023.) The first award was given to Giuseppe Curigliano.

== Works ==
- Da bambino avevo un sogno. Tra ricerca e cura, la mia lotta al tumore (2002)
- Una carezza per guarire. La nuova medicina tra scienza e coscienza (with Mario Pappagallo, 2005)
- Il diritto di morire. La libertà del laico di fronte alla sofferenza (2005)
- La fecondazione assistita. Riflessioni di otto grandi giuristi (2005, preface)
- Essere laico (with Alain Elkann, 2007)
- L'ombra e la luce. La mia lotta contro il male (2008)
- Dell'amore e del dolore delle donne (2010)
- Scienza e pace (with Alessandro Cecchi Paone, 2011)
- Il diritto di non soffrire. Cure palliative, testamento biologico, eutanasia (2011)
- Verso la scelta vegetariana. Il tumore si previene anche a tavola (with Mario Pappagallo, 2011)
- Longevità (2012)
- Responsabilità della vita (2013, with Giovanni Reale)
- La dieta del digiuno. Perdere peso e prevenire le malattie con la restrizione calorica (2013)
- Il mestiere di uomo (2014)
- Il mio mondo è donna (2015 with Maria Giovanni Luini)
- Tre sere alla settimana. 300 film, 12 anni di passione cinematografica (2015)
- Breast Cancer: Innovations in Research and Management (with Aron Goldhirsch, 2017)
- Il diritto di essere umani (2018)
- I segreti della lunga vita (with Mario Pappagallo, 2021)

== Bibliography ==
- "Umberto Veronesi". European Institute of Oncology. 2006. Archived from the original on 25 February 2007.
