= Packham =

Packham is a surname. Notable people with the surname include:

- Blair Packham, Canadian singer-songwriter
- Chris Packham (born 1961), English naturalist, nature photographer, television presenter and writer
- David Packham (1832–1912), Australian politician
- Greg Packham (born 1959), Australian rules footballer
- Jenny Packham (born 1965), British fashion designer
- Leonard Packham (1891–1958), Australian cricketer
- Marian Packham, Canadian biochemist
- Peter Packham (born 1941), English cricket administrator
- Will Packham (born 1981), English footballer

== See also ==
- Peckham (surname)
