= Federation of European Cancer Societies =

International non-profit association

The Federation of European Cancer Societies (FECS), founded in 1981, was an international non-profit association that co-ordinated collaboration between European societies active in different fields of cancer research, prevention and treatment with the ultimate goal of providing the best possible treatment and care for all European cancer patients. After consulting many professionals in the oncology community, FECS was transformed into the European Cancer Organisation in 2007.

== See also ==
- European Cancer Organisation
