= Catherine Peckham =

British paediatrician

Professor Catherine Peckham CBE FMedSci FRCP FRCPath FRCOG FRCPCH FFPH

Professor of Paediatric Epidemiology, Institute of Child Health
- In office 1985–2002

Personal details
- Born: Catherine Stevenson King; 7 March 1937 (age 89) London, England

Catherine Stevenson Peckham (née King; born 7 March 1937) is a British paediatrician.

Peckham was the first Professor of Paediatric Epidemiology in the UK, and established the Centre for Paediatric Epidemiology and Biostatistics at the UCL Institute of Child Health, University College London. The Peckham Lecture is given each year at the Institute of Child Health.

== Life ==
Peckham was born in London, the daughter of Alexander King, and spent her early years in the USA. She was educated at St Paul's Girls' School and at University College London. She was married to Sir Michael Peckham.

== Medical career ==
As a clinical epidemiologist Peckham is best known for her work on infections in pregnancy, particularly rubella, cytomegalovirus and HIV, and their impact on the fetus and developing child. She showed that rubella damage caused by exposure to maternal infection during pregnancy could continue after birth. She worked on the early rubella vaccine trials and was instrumental in setting up the National Congenital Rubella Surveillance Programme.

In 1986 she founded the multi-centre European Collaborative Study (ECS) on HIV in mothers and children with Carlo Giaquinto. She was instrumental in establishing the national surveillance of HIV infection in pregnancy and childhood. Her study of vaccination for infectious diseases in childhood was published by Action Research as the Peckham Report in 1989. In 1986 she co-founded the British Paediatric Surveillance Unit. From 2005 to 2007 she chaired the Scientific Coordinating Group for the Government's Foresight Programme on the Future Challenge of infectious Diseases.

Peckham has been closely involved in national birth cohort studies and the influence of biological, social and environmental factors in early life on later development has been a central theme in her work.

== Awards and honours ==
- CBE for services to child health, 1998
- Harding Award for the prevention of child disability, 1993
- 20th Anniversary Award for Leadership in HIV Child Care, Terence Higgins Trust, 2002
- James Spence Medal, Royal College of Paediatrics and Child Health, 2003
- Founder Fellow of the Academy of Medical Sciences, 1998

== National and international positions ==
- Chair, Positive Action for Children Fund, 2010–
- Chair, Medical Research Council Review of Gulf War Related Illness
- Vice-President of Fonds de Solidarite Therapeutique Internationale 1998–2000
- Chair, WHO Epidemiological Research and Forecasting, Global Programme on Aids, 1991–94
- Member then vice-chair, Nuffield Council on Bioethics, 1999–2006
- Chair, Medical Research Council Human Fertilization and Embryology Working Group on children conceived by Assisted Reproduction, 2004
- Chair, Royal College of Obstetricians and Gynaecologists' Working Party on Termination of Pregnancy for Fetal Abnormality (2008/9)
- US-UK Fulbright Commissioner, Fulbright Commission 1986–1994)
- non-executive director, Advertising Standards Authority 1993–1999
- Vice-Chair, Board of Governors St Paul's Girls' School London, 1993–2006
- Governor of St Paul's School
- Member of Council, Institute of Education 1999–2007
