= European Cancer Organisation =

Nonprofit federation of cancer organizations

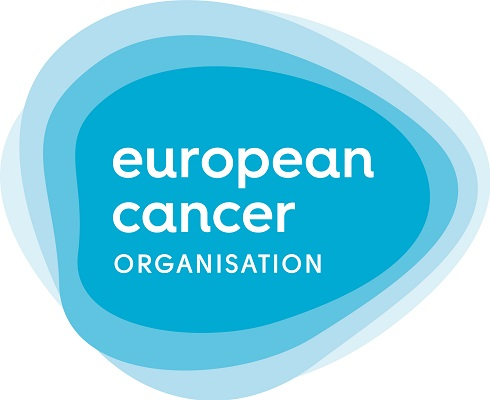
- Formation: 2007 (1981 as FECS)
- Headquarters: Brussels, Belgium
- Website: europeancancer.org

The European Cancer Organisation is a not-for-profit federation of 41 Member Societies working in cancer at a European level, together with 21 European Patient Advisory Committee members. The Organisation is dedicated to convening oncology professionals and patients to agree on policy, advocate for positive change, and speak for the European cancer community. The European Cancer Organisation is the organiser of the annual European Cancer Summit.

== History ==
In the early 1980s, a few European visionaries working in oncology laid the groundwork for multidisciplinarity in cancer care, entailing that tackling cancer was a team effort that required a coordinated approach. It was a relatively new concept at the time, but 40 years later, multidisciplinarity is viewed as the best approach cancer treatment.

It was consequently decided to bring together major players in cancer research, treatment, and care in order to create awareness of patients’ wishes and needs, encourage progressive thinking in cancer policy, education, and training, and continue to promote European cancer research and its application through the organisation of a multidisciplinary conference called ECCO - the European Conference on Clinical Oncology (later renamed ECCO-the European Cancer Conference). To strengthen and further develop these ideas, in 1981 six professional societies, ESMO, ESTRO, ESSO, EACR, EONS, SIOPE legally founded FECS (Federation of European Cancer Societies).

After a period of reflection in 2006 and 2007, during which many players in oncology were consulted, FECS was transformed into a new dynamic entity: the European Cancer Organisation. This was officially announced at the European Cancer Conference in Barcelona in September 2007, where the organisation was launched under its new name.

== Administration ==
The European Cancer Organisation is run by a Board of Directors and Executive Committee. The President for 2024-2025 is Csaba Dégi. The organisation has an office in Brussels, Belgium with a Chief Executive and a team of staff and consultants.

== Foundation ==
In 2023, the European Cancer Organisation founded the European Cancer Community Foundation, with a launch at the European Parliament in June 2023 and the first grants being awarded in November 2023 during the European Cancer Summit. By statute, the Chair of the European Cancer Foundation is the Past President of the European Cancer Organisation.
