= Henry Peckham (MP for Wycombe) =

16th-century English politician

Henry Peckham (1526 – 8 July 1556) was an English courtier, and a Member of Parliament for Chipping Wycombe from 1553 to 1555. He was a member of the Dudley conspiracy against Queen Mary. Following his arrest, he was imprisoned in the Tower of London on 18 March 1556, tried on 7 May in London's Guildhall and executed by hanging at Tower Hill in 7 or 8 July 1556. After execution his head was displayed on London Bridge, and his body was buried at Allhallows, Barking.

Peckham was the second son of Sir Edmund Peckham, cofferer to Henry VIII, and became an MP through his family's connections in Buckinghamshire.
