= European Organisation for Research and Treatment of Cancer =

International nonprofit organization

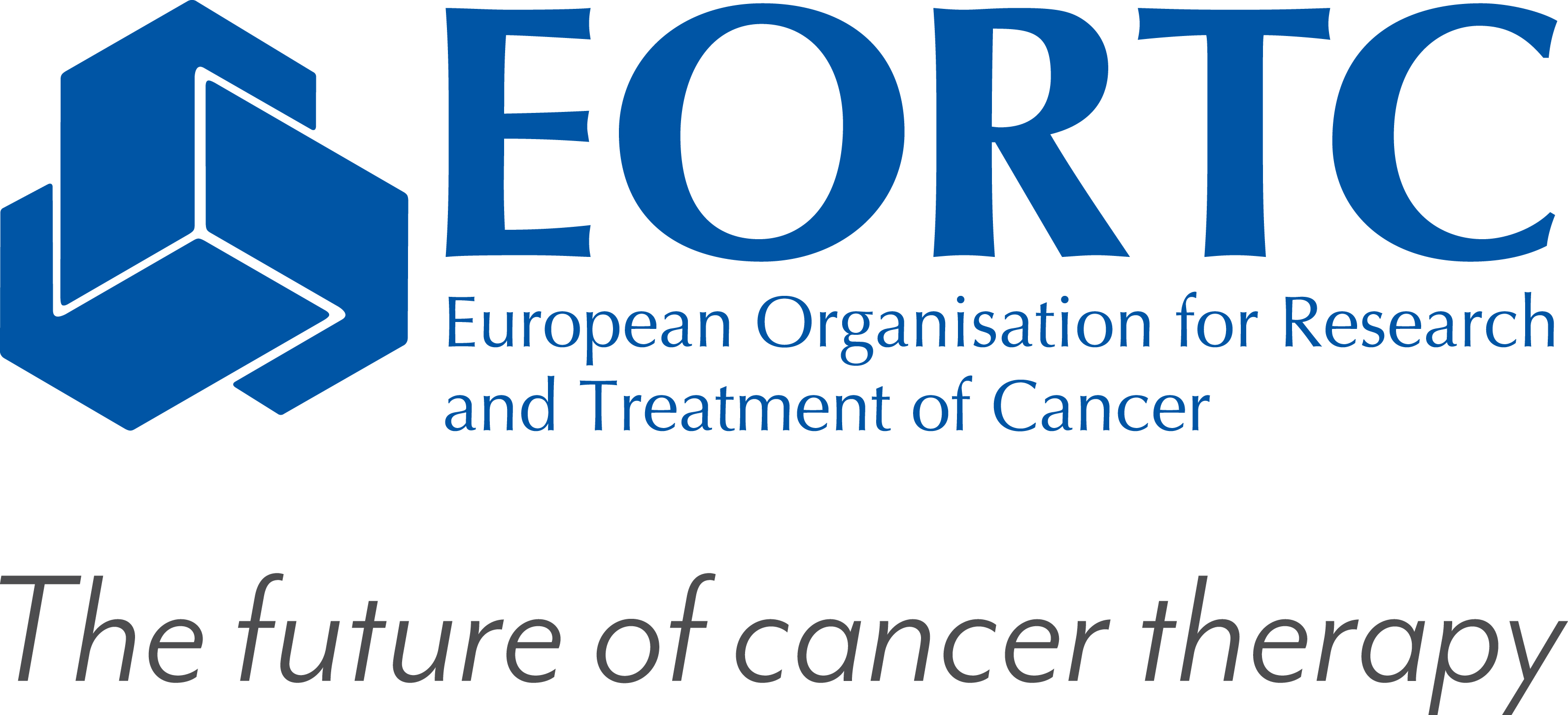
EORTC Logo

The European Organisation for Research and Treatment of Cancer (EORTC) is a unique pan-European non-profit clinical cancer research organisation established in 1962 operating as an international association under Belgium law. It develops, conducts, coordinates and stimulates high-quality translational and clinical trial research to improve the survival and quality of life of cancer patients. This is achieved through the development of new drugs and other innovative approaches, and the testing of more effective therapeutic strategies, using currently approved drugs, surgery and/or radiotherapy in clinical trials conducted under the auspices of a vast network of clinical cancer researchers supported by 220 staff members based in Brussels. The EORTC has the expertise to conduct large and complex trials especially specific populations such as the older patient and rare tumours.

== Mission, achievements, and network ==
The EORTC's mission is to increase people's survival and quality of life by testing new therapeutic strategies based on existing drugs, surgery and radiotherapy. The EORTC also helps develop new drugs and approaches in partnership with the pharmaceutical industry and in patients' best interests.

EORTC achievements

In order to adapt to the changing landscape of clinical trial design, the EORTC has developed a number of platforms, which will facilitate more cost effective and efficient trials and gather important information to provide better treatment and care to cancer patients and survivors. These platforms include SPECTA-molecular screening of patients, SUCARE- evaluating quality assurance in surgical oncology, E^{2}-RADIATE- evaluating quality assurance in radiation oncology and the YOU (Your Outcome Updates) protocol that will gather data on long term long-term medical, psychological and socio-economic outcomes of patients treated in clinical trials.

Its network

The EORTC research network consists of over 3,900 collaborators from all disciplines involved in cancer treatment and research in more than 930 institutions in 63 countries. Its research spans the entire spectrum from translational and preclinical research to large, prospective, multi-centre, phase III clinical trials that evaluate new cancer therapies and/or treatment strategies as well as patient quality of life. Currently, the EORTC is conducting 167 studies, and thousands of patients (85% from within the EU) participate in EORTC clinical trials. 25,000 patients continue to be followed on a yearly basis, and the EORTC clinical study database now contains outcome data for over 190,000 cancer patients.

Alongside the EORTC scientific and clinical programme, the EORTC collaborates with a number of international organisations, including the US National Cancer Institute, National Cancer Institute Canada, and other countrywide groups. Also a number of academic societies such as European Society for Therapeutic Radiation Oncology, European Society of Surgical Oncology, European Society of Medical Oncology and European Society of Paediatric Oncology. In order to follow changing regulatory requirements, the EORTC regularly converses with the US Food and Drug Administration and the European Medicines Evaluation Agency.

== Figures ==
- Over 700 universities or affiliated hospitals in 27 countries
- Over 3500 collaborators (Medical Oncologists, Radiation Oncologists, Organ Specialists, Surgical Oncologists, Imaging Specialists)
- Over 198,000 patients in the EORTC database

== Results ==
The EORTC has designed new benchmark treatments, in particular for:

- Improving the survival of patients with testicular cancer, Hodgkin's lymphoma, leukemia (child or adult), gastrointestinal stromal tumor, brain tumor, etc.
- Avoiding a laryngectomy for 42% of patients with larynx cancer
- Carrying out surgery which is less mutilating in the case of breast cancer
- Improving the quality of life for patients (ambulatory care, fertility preservation, etc.)
- Effectively controlling infections for patients with leukemia, etc.

== Funding ==
EORTC Cancer Research Fund (ECRF)

The EORTC Cancer Research Fund (ECRF) was created in 1976 to collect the necessary funds for the EORTC to function with the cooperation of national cancer leagues involved in the fight against cancer (Germany, Belgium, Denmark, France, Hong Kong, Norway, The Netherlands, The UK, Switzerland, Sweden, etc.). Princess Dina Mired of Jordan is the Honorary President and Count Diego du Monceau de Bergendal chairs the Board of Directors of the ECRF.

Transparent and diversified financing

EORTC research is supported by the EORTC Cancer Research Fund (ECRF), the National Cancer Institute (NCI) of the United States of America, Fonds Cancer (FOCA), and the Belgian National Lottery. The European Commission provides support only for selected projects. Partnerships with the pharmaceutical industry have been set up within the framework of special studies approved by an independent peer review committee. Nevertheless, more than 70% of clinical studies led by the EORTC focus on drugs that have already been commercialized or on combined strategies such as radiotherapy and surgery and consequently these studies require financial support from other sources. Additional contributions and sponsorship are vital to cover these scientific activities where the main goal is to effectively promote European cancer clinical research.

== Main scientific events and methodology courses ==
- EORTC Groups Annual Meeting (EGAM), biyearly conference
- EORTC - NCI - AACR Symposium on Molecular Targets and Cancer Therapeutics, biyearly conference
- European Breast Cancer Conference - EBCC as part of EBC Council, biyearly conference
- Clinical Trial Statistics for non Statisticians, yearly course
- A One-Day Journey through EORTC Activities, yearly course
- Course dedicated to Patients and Caregivers interested in Cancer Clinical Research, biyearly course
- EORTC - ESMO - AACR Workshop on Methods in Clinical Cancer Research (MCCR), yearly course

== See also ==
- American Cancer Society Cancer Action Network
- American Cancer Society Center
- caBIG, the Cancer BioInformatics Grid, a National Cancer Institute (USA) initiative to link cancer researchers and their data
- Canadian Cancer Society
- Federation of European Cancer Societies
- International Agency for Research on Cancer (United Nations)
- Journal of the National Cancer Institute
- List of EORTC trials
- National Cancer Institute (United States)
- National Comprehensive Cancer Network
- NCI-designated Cancer Center
- Oncology
- Programme of Action for Cancer Therapy A close partner in dealing with cancer care in developing world
