= Miller baronets of Chichester (1705) =

Escutcheon of the Miller baronets of Chichester

The Miller baronetcy, of Chichester in the County of Sussex, was created in the Baronetage of England on 29 October 1705 for Thomas Miller, Member of Parliament for Chichester. His father Mark Miller was an Alderman and Mayor of Chichester.

The 2nd Baronet represented Chichester and Sussex in the House of Commons; the 3rd Baronet was Member of Parliament for Chichester. The 5th Baronet sat as Member of Parliament for Lewes and Portsmouth.

== Miller baronets, of Chichester (1705) ==
- Sir Thomas Miller, 1st Baronet (c. 1635–1705)
- Sir John Miller, 2nd Baronet (1665–1721)
- Sir Thomas Miller, 3rd Baronet (c. 1689–1733)
- Sir John Miller, 4th Baronet (died 1772)
- Sir Thomas Miller, 5th Baronet (c. 1735–1816)
- Sir Thomas Combe Miller, 6th Baronet (1781–1864)
- Sir Charles Hayes Miller, 7th Baronet (1829–1868)
- Sir Charles John Hubert Miller, 8th Baronet (1858–1940)
- Sir Henry Holmes Miller, 9th Baronet (1865–1952)
- Sir Ernest Henry John Miller, 10th Baronet (1897–1960)
- Sir John Holmes Miller, 11th Baronet (1925–1995)
- Sir Harry Miller, 12th Baronet (1927–2007)
- Sir Anthony Thomas Miller, 13th Baronet (born 1955)

The heir apparent is Thomas Kensington Miller (born 1994).

== Extended family ==
Sir Henry Miller, second son of the 6th Baronet, was Speaker of the New Zealand Legislative Council from 1892 to 1903.
