= Richard Farington =

English Whig politician (c. 1644–1719)

Farington baronets
- Escutcheon of the Farington baronets of Chichester
- Creation date: 1697
- Status: extinct
- Extinction date: 1719

Sir Richard Farington, 1st Baronet (c. 1644 – 7 August 1719) was an English Whig politician who sat in the English House of Commons between 1681 and 1701 and in the British House of Commons between 1708 and 1719.

== Life ==
Farington was the son of Sir John Farington and his wife Ann May, daughter of John May, of Rawmere, Sussex. He married Elizabeth Peachey, daughter of John Peachey, of Ertham by licence dated 24 May 1687.

Farington was appointed Commissioner for assessment for Sussex for 1679 to 1780. He was returned as Member of Parliament for Chichester at a by-election on 4 January 1681 in succession to his father and returned again at the general election later that year. He sat until 1685. He was commissioner for inquiry into recusancy fines in 1687 and was appointed Justice of the Peace in May 1688.

In 1690, Farington was appointed Commissioner for assessment for Sussex again. He was selected as High Sheriff of Sussex for the year 1696 to 1697. By 1697 he was captain of the militia foot of Chichester. In December 1697 he was created a baronet, of Chichester in the County of Sussex. He was returned as MP for Chichester at the 1698 English general election, did not stand in the first general election of 1701 and was defeated in the second general election of the year. He was re-elected MP for Chichester at the 1708 British general election. He was returned again at the 1710 British general election, but was defeated at the 1713 British general election. He was returned as a Whig MP for Chichester at the 1715 British general election and voted with the government until his death.

Farington died at Bath in August 1719. He had three sons who all died in his lifetime, and the baronetcy became extinct.

Parliament of England
Preceded by John Bramam; John Farrington	Member of Parliament for Chichester; 1681–1685; With: John Braman	Succeeded by Sir Richard May; George Gounter
Preceded by The Earl of Ranelagh; William Elson	Member of Parliament for Chichester; 1698–1701; With: John Miller	Succeeded by Thomas May; William Elson
Parliament of Great Britain
Preceded by Sir Thomas Littleton, Bt; Thomas Onslow	Member of Parliament for Chichester; 1708–1713; With: Thomas Carr 1708–1710; Sir John Miller, Bt 1710–1713	Succeeded by William Elson; James Brudenell
Preceded by William Elson; James Brudenell	Member of Parliament for Chichester; 1715–1719; With: Thomas Miller	Succeeded by Thomas Miller; Henry Kelsall
Baronetage of England
New creation	Baronet (of Chichester); 1697–1719	Extinct
