= Henry Peckham =

Henry Peckham may refer to:

- Henry Peckham (MP for Chichester) (1615–1673), English politician
- Henry Peckham (MP for Wycombe), MP for Wycombe

== See also ==
- Harry Peckham (1740–1787), English barrister, sportsman and letter-writer
