= Sir Thomas Littleton, 3rd Baronet =

English lawyer and politician (1647–1709)

Sir Thomas Littleton, 3rd Baronet, often Thomas de Littleton, (3 April 1647 – 31 December 1709), of North Ockendon, Essex and Stoke St. Milborough, Shropshire, was an English lawyer and Whig politician who sat in the English and British House of Commons between 1689 and 1709. He served as Speaker of the House of Commons of England from 1698 to 1700, and as Treasurer of the Navy until his death.

== Biography ==
Littleton was the son of Sir Thomas Littleton, 2nd Baronet (died 1681), and his wife and cousin Anne Littleton. He was related to Thomas de Littleton, a 15th-century jurist and legal theorist of the Littleton/Lyttelton family. He matriculated at St Edmund Hall, Oxford in 1665 and was admitted at Inner Temple in 1666. In 1671, he was called to the bar. He succeeded his father in the baronetcy on 12 April 1681. On 6 September 1682, he married Anne Baun (died 1714), daughter of Benjamin Baun alias Baron, of Westcote, Gloucestershire.

Littleton was returned as Member of Parliament for Woodstock at the 1689 English general election. He was Speaker of the House of Commons of England from 1698 to 1700. He was appointed Treasurer of the Navy in 1699 and held the post for the rest of his life. At the 1702 English general election he was returned as MP for Castle Rising. At the 1705 English general election he was returned as MP for Chichester. He was returned as MP for Portsmouth at the 1708 British general election.

Upon his death, without issue in 1709 aged 62, the baronetcy expired, but his estate passed to his first cousin Mrs Elizabeth Meynell, the daughter of his uncle Edward Littleton.

Macaulay thus sums up the character of Speaker Littleton and his relations with the Whigs: "He was one of their ablest, most zealous and most steadfast friends; and had been, both in the House of Commons and at the board of treasury, an invaluable second to Montague" (the Earl of Halifax).

Parliament of England
Preceded by Richard Bertie; Sir Littleton Osbaldeston, Bt	Member of Parliament for Woodstock; 1689–1702; With: Sir John Doyley 1689–1690; Thomas Wheate 1690–1695; James Bertie 1695–1702	Succeeded by James Bertie; Sir William Glynne, Bt
Preceded by Robert Walpole; Marquess of Hartington	Member of Parliament for Castle Rising; 1702–1705; With: Horatio Walpole	Succeeded by Horatio Walpole; Sir Robert Clayton
Preceded by John Miller; William Elson	Member of Parliament for Chichester; 1705–1707; With: William Elson 1705; Thomas Onslow 1705–1707	Succeeded by Parliament of Great Britain
Parliament of Great Britain
Preceded by Parliament of England	Member of Parliament for Chichester; 1707–1708; With: Thomas Onslow	Succeeded by Thomas Carr; Sir Richard Farington, Bt
Preceded by George Churchill; Thomas Erle	Member of Parliament for Portsmouth; 1708–1709; With: George Churchill	Succeeded by George Churchill; Sir Charles Wager
Political offices
Preceded by The Earl of Anglesey	Treasurer of the Navy; 1668–1671; Served alongside: Sir Thomas Osborne	Succeeded by Sir Thomas Osborne
Preceded by John Swaddell	Clerk of the Ordnance; 1690–1696	Succeeded by Christopher Musgrave
Preceded by Paul Foley	Speaker of the House of Commons of England; 1698–1700	Succeeded by Robert Harley
Preceded by The Earl of Orford	Treasurer of the Navy; 1699–1710	Succeeded by Robert Walpole
Baronetage of England
Preceded by Thomas Littleton	Baronet (of Stoke Milburgh, Suffolk); 1681–1709	Extinct
