= John Farrington (MP) =

English politician (1609–1680)

John Farrington (c.1609 – 1680) was an English politician who sat in the House of Commons at various times between 1660 and 1680.

Farrington was the son of Thomas Farrington of Chichester and his wife Dorothy Payne, daughter of Henry Payne of Chichester. His father was mayor of Chichester four times. He matriculated at Brasenose College, Oxford on 30 June 1626, aged 17. In 1633 he was a student of Gray's Inn. He was involved in an attempt to rescue three Royalists in the city in 1647. He succeeded his father in 1654. In 1660, he was elected Member of Parliament for Chichester for the Convention Parliament when he was involved in a double return but was seated on the merits of the election. He was a J.P. for Sussex from July 1660 to 1680 and commissioner for sewers for West Sussex in October 1660. He was commissioner for assessment for Sussex from 1661 to 1664 and for Chichester from 1663 to 1664. He was Sheriff of Sussex from 1666 to 1667. In October 1679 he was elected MP for Chichester again. He was commissioner for assessment for Sussex from 1679 until his death.

Farrington died in 1680 and was buried at St Peter the Great, Chichester on 18 December 1680.

Farrington married by licence of 9 June 1638, Anne May, daughter of John May of Rawmere and had two sons and three daughters.

Parliament of England
Preceded by Not represented in Restored Rump	Member of Parliament for Chichester; 1660; With: Henry Peckham	Succeeded by Henry Peckham; William Garway
Preceded by John Braman; Richard May	Member of Parliament for Chichester; 1679–1680; With: John Braman	Succeeded by John Braman; Richard Farington
