= 1774 English cricket season =

Cricket season review

The Laws of Cricket were substantially revised before the beginning of the 1774 English cricket season. The scorecards of five historically important eleven-a-side matches have survived, and there are reports of eight other important matches, including two single wicket events. (Note: Any match listed in the ACS' Important Match Guide (1981) is historically important, and therefore of the highest standard, whether or not a scorecard might exist. The same applies to numerous matches discovered by researchers since 1981. For further information, see First-class cricket.) Hampshire did much better than in 1773, and were unbeaten in their known results to the end of July but then they lost twice to Kent in August.

Joseph Miller, with an innings of 95 for Kent against Hampshire, created a new record for the highest known individual score, beating the old record of 88 which was shared by Richard Newland and William Yalden.

== Single wicket ==
Records have survived of two important matches played under single wicket rules. The first on 6–7 June was a five-a-side match between Hampshire and Kent at Moulsey Hurst for a stake of 100 guineas a side. Lumpy Stevens and Samuel Colchin played as given men for Hampshire and John Minshull as one for Kent. Hampshire scored 118 and 127; Kent scored 21 and 36. Hampshire won by 188 runs. Tom Sueter with 74 in the second Hampshire innings scored more than both innings of Kent on his own.

The Kentish Gazette on 22 June advertised a single wicket match at Sevenoaks Vine on 27 June for £100 a side between the Kent professionals John Wood (i.e., the bowler from Seal) and William Bullen of Greenwich. The outcome was not reported.

Also on 27 June, there was a five-a-side match between teams called Middlesex and London on Marylebone Fields, but this is believed to have been a minor event; the stake there was £20.

== England v Hampshire ==
The scorecards of five important eleven-a-side matches, all involving Hampshire, have survived. In these five, Hampshire played twice each against England and Kent; the fifth match was against Surrey. Limited information about other matches has been found in contemporary newspapers.

=== 22 to 24 June ===
The first match between Hampshire and England was played 22 to 24 June on Broadhalfpenny Down. England batted first and were dismissed for 122, of which Minshull scored 37. Hampshire responded with 307. The scorecard shows that nine Hampshire batters reached double figures, and the other two both scored 9. Their top scorers were Sueter (67) and John Small (47). In their second innings, England were all out for 133, Minshull scoring 38, and so Hampshire won by an innings and 52 runs. Scores and Biographies has Laleham Burway as the venue, but research by The Association of Cricket Statisticians and Historians (ACS) has confirmed that it was Broadhalfpenny Down. No bowling or fielding details are known, but Hampshire's attack was strengthened by the addition of star bowler Lumpy as a given man.

=== 8 and 9 July ===
The return match was played 8 and 9 July on Sevenoaks Vine. Hampshire won by 169 runs.

Hampshire, batting first, scored 139. James Aylward (29) and George Leer (28) were their top scorers. Bowling for England, William Bullen took five wickets, all bowled. This is the first time that a bowler can definitely be credited with the 5wI feat. (Note: Scorers in the 18th century would only credit the bowler with a wicket if the batter was bowled or lbw. Catches and stumpings were credited to the fielder or wicket-keeper only.) England were all out for 88 after Lumpy, Thomas Brett, and Nyren took two wickets apiece. Hampshire, with a first innings lead of 51, extended this to 233 by scoring 182 in their second innings. Aylward scored 61 and Sueter scored 30. In their second innings, England were dismissed for 64, Lumpy taking four wickets. Hampshire were greatly helped by having Lumpy as a given man.

Both of John Wood (Kent) and John Wood (Surrey) were playing for England. One of them made the top score of 27 in England's first innings, and one of them took three second innings wickets (they might well have shared the wickets). However, it was definitely John Wood of Surrey who took a catch in the first innings.

This was the final known appearance in important matches by John Frame, the Kent fast bowler who was held by John Nyren to have been 'the other principal with Lumpy' (i.e., in opposition to Hambledon). Frame's greatest years were behind him when the statistical record began (he would have been 39) in 1772, having started playing in 1749. The bulk of his career was through the 1750s and 1760s; Scores & Biographies records him bowling for the Dartford/Kent team which beat England twice in 1759.

== Surrey v Hampshire ==
=== 28 July ===
Hampshire played two matches against Surrey. A scorecard has survived from the first on 28 July at Guildford Bason, which Hampshire won by 7 wickets.

There was an outstanding fast bowling performance in this match by Hampshire's Thomas Brett, who took at least nine wickets (i.e., nine were bowled out). Surrey were dismissed for 61 and 77, Brett bowling five in the first innings and four in the second. His 5wI is the second on record after Bullen's haul three weeks previously. Brett's match haul of nine was the highest on record at this time. Will Palmer batted well in Surrey's first innings, and made 26*. Hampshire scored 91 and 48/3.

=== 27 September ===
The second match was on 27 September at Laleham Burway. The result is unknown. It was advertised on Saturday, 24 September in the St James Chronicle. The stakes were £100 a side, and Surrey were to have Samuel Colchin as a given man.

== Hampshire v Kent ==
=== 13 and 14 July ===
Hampshire played Kent three times. There is no scorecard for the first match, played 13/14 July on Broadhalfpenny Down. Hampshire won by 10 wickets. The stake was £525. Kent had Lumpy, Thomas White, and Samuel Colchin as given men, though Colchin seems to have been a Kent man. Kent issued a challenge to play two further matches (see below).

=== 8 to 10 August ===
The second match was played 8 to 10 August on Sevenoaks Vine. Kent won by innings and 35 runs.

Lumpy had played as a given man for Hampshire in earlier matches, but this time he was given to Kent. He took four bowled wickets in Hampshire's first innings of 46. Kent then made a total of 240, which included a known record score of 95 by Joseph Miller, beating the previous known record of 88 by Richard Newland in 1745, and by William Yalden in 1773. The Duke of Dorset, who was not only a patron but also a good player, supported Miller with 77 runs. In their second innings, Hampshire did better and scored 159, Small making 55*.

This was the final match in the "first phase" of Richard Purchase's career. The Hampshire bowler did not appear again until the 1781 season, but then continued to play regularly until he finally retired after the 1803 season. William Brazier, who became a prominent player for many years, made his first recorded senior appearance in the match for Kent.

=== 15 to 18 August ===
The final match, a few days later, was on Broadhalfpenny Down. Kent won by 4 wickets.

Hampshire scored 174 (Small 45, Nyren 35, Aylward 30; Lumpy 3 wickets) and 129 (Edward Aburrow Jr 33, Richard Francis 22). Kent scored 168 (Miller 40) and 136/6 (White 50, Miller 45). William Hogsflesh played as a substitute fielder in Kent's second innings because he did not bat for Hampshire. It is not known if he fielded in the Kent first innings. Even so, he was allowed to bowl, as he took the wicket of Richard Simmons.

== Other events ==
The ACS list includes an Essex v Kent match at Ingatestone on 8 August but that was the same day as the Kent v Hampshire match at Sevenoaks, so it was probably a minor match between two parish teams using the names of their counties.

Maidstone played Sussex on 10 August at an unspecified venue in the town of Maidstone. Sussex had two unnamed given men, both from Kent. It is known that Sussex still needed three to win when their last man went in to bat, and they won by 1 wicket. The Maidstone team may have been the Duke of Dorset's XI. The teams were to meet again on 24 August at a venue in Peasmarsh, but no post-match report has been found.

On 22–23 August, London hosted Chertsey on the Artillery Ground. Chertsey scored 146 and 97; in reply, London scored 158 and 86/5 to win by 5 wickets.

Hambledon Parish v Hampshire was arranged for 14 September on Broadhalfpenny Down; the result is unknown. This has historical interest but, as with a similar fixture in an earlier season, it was probably a minor match.

== The Laws of Cricket 1774 ==
The Laws of Cricket, first drafted ahead of the 1744 season, were extensively revised on 25 February 1774 by a committee representing several clubs and counties. They met at the Star and Garter in Pall Mall, London. The chairman was Sir William Draper, and other members were the Duke of Dorset, the Earl of Tankerville, Sir Horatio Mann, Philip Dehany, John Brewer Davis, Harry Peckham, Charles Powlett, Francis Vincent, John Cooke, Charles Coles, and Richard James.

As reprinted in Scores & Biographies, the revised Laws stated:

- The ball must weigh not less than five ounces and a half, nor more than five ounces and three-quarters.
- It cannot be changed during the game, but with consent of both parties.
- The bat must not exceed four inches and one quarter in the widest part.
- The stumps must be twenty-two inches, the bail six inches long.
- The bowling-crease must be parallel with the stumps, three feet in length, with a return-crease.
- The popping-crease must be three feet ten inches from the wickets; and the wickets must be opposite to each other at the distance of twenty-two yards.
- The party which goes from Home shall have the choice of the innings and the pitching of the wickets, which shall be pitched within thirty yards of a centre fixed by the adversaries.
- When the parties meet at a third place, the bowlers shall toss up for the pitching of the first wicket, and the choice of going in.
- The bowler must deliver the ball with one foot behind the bowling-crease, and within the return-crease; and shall Bowl four balls before he changes wickets, which he shall do but once in the same innings.
- He may order the player at his wicket to stand on which side of it he pleases.
- The striker is out if the bail is bowled off, or the stump bowled out of the ground.
- Or if the ball, from a stroke over or under his bat, or upon his hands (but not wrists), is held before it touches the ground, though it be hugged to the body of the catcher.
- Or if, in striking, both his feet are over the popping-crease, and his wicket is put down, except his bat is grounded within it.
- Or if he runs out of his ground to hinder a catch.
- Or if the ball is struck up, and he wilfully strike it again.
- Or if in running a notch, the wicket is struck down by a throw, or with the ball in hand, before his foot, hand, or bat is grounded over the popping-crease; but if the bail is off, a stump must be struck out of the ground by the ball.
- Or if the striker touches or takes up the ball before it has lain still, unless at the request of the opposite party.
- Or if the striker puts his leg before the wicket with a design to stop the ball, and actually prevent the ball from hitting his wicket by it.
- If the players have crossed each other, he that runs for the wicket that is put down is out; if they are not crossed, he that has left the wicket that is put down is out.
- When the ball has been in the bowler's or wicket-keeper's hands, the strikers need not keep within their ground until the Umpire has called Play; but if the player goes out of his ground with an intent to run before the ball is delivered, the bowler may put him out.
- When the ball is struck up in the running ground between the wickets, it is lawful for the strikers to hinder its being caught; but they must neither strike at, nor touch the ball with their hands.
- If the ball is struck up, the striker may guard his wicket either with his bat or his body.
- In single-wicket matches, if the striker moves out of his ground to strike at the ball, he shall be allowed no notch for such stroke.
- The wicket-keeper shall stand at a reasonable distance behind the wicket, and shall not move until the ball is out of the bowler's hand, and shall not by any noise incommode the striker; and if his hands, knees, foot, or head, be over or before the wicket, though the ball hit it, it shall not be out.
- The umpires shall allow two minutes for each man to come in, and fifteen minutes between each innings; when the Umpire shall call Play, the party refusing to play shall lose the match.
- They are the sole judges of fair and unfair play, and all disputes shall be determined by them.
- When a striker is hurt they are to allow another to come in, and the person hurt shall have his hands in any part of that innings.
- They are not to order a player out, unless appealed to by the adversaries.
- But if the bowler's foot is not behind the bowling-crease, and within the return-crease, when he delivers the ball, the Umpire unasked must call No Ball.
- If the strikers run a short notch, the Umpire must call No Notch.
- bets.—If the notches of one player are laid against another, the bet depends on both innings, unless otherwise specified.
- If one party beats the other in one innings, the notches in the first innings shall determine the bet.
- But if the other party goes in a second time, then the bet must be determined by the number on the score.

== First mentions ==
=== Clubs and teams ===
- Maidstone

=== Counties ===
- Wiltshire (c. 1774) (Note: There is no certainty about when cricket was first mentioned in Wiltshire. Rowland Bowen gave 1769 as the first date, but he had mistakenly ascribed a Hampshire venue to Wiltshire. John Major, writing about an event in 1799, stated that cricket had been played in the towns of Calne, Devizes, Salisbury, and Marlborough 'for a quarter of a century'.)

=== Players ===
- William Brazier (Kent)
- Muggeridge (Surrey)
- Waller (Kent)

=== Venues ===
- Peasmarsh (unspecified)

== Bibliography ==
- ACS (1981). A Guide to Important Cricket Matches Played in the British Isles 1709–1863. Nottingham: ACS. OCLC 85045528.
- Ashley-Cooper, F. S. (1929). Kent Cricket Matches, 1719–1880. Canterbury: Gibbs & Sons. OCLC 220674085.
- Buckley, G. B. (1935). Fresh Light on 18th Century Cricket. Birmingham: Cotterell & Co. OCLC 23450280.
- Haygarth, Arthur (1996) [1862]. Scores & Biographies, Volume 1 (1744–1826). Kennington: Frederick Lillywhite. ISBN 978-19-00592-23-9.
- Major, John (2007). More Than A Game. London: HarperCollins. ISBN 978-00-07183-64-7 – via Internet Archive.
- McCann, Tim (2004). Sussex Cricket in the Eighteenth Century (PDF). Vol. 88. Lewes: West Sussex Record Office. ISBN 978-08-54450-55-8.
- Nyren, John (1998) [1832]. Mote, Ashley (ed.). The Cricketers of my Time. London: Robson Publishing. ISBN 978-18-61051-68-4.
- Waghorn, H. T. (2005) [1906]. The Dawn of Cricket. London: J. W. McKenzie. ISBN 978-09-47821-17-3.
