= William Younger =

William Younger may refer to:

- William Younger (brewery), an Edinburgh-based brewery that was part of Scottish Brewers, later Scottish & Newcastle, now a brand of Wells & Young
  - William Younger I, whose son Archibald Campbell Younger named the eponymous brewery for him
- Sir William Younger, 1st Baronet, of Auchen Castle (1862–1937), Scottish politician
- William L. Younger (1894–1977), American football player, coach, and college athletics administrator
- William McEwan Younger (1905–1992), Scottish brewer and political activist

== See also ==
- William the Younger (disambiguation)
