= 64th Regiment of Foot (disambiguation) =

Three regiments of the British Army have been numbered the 64th Regiment of Foot:

- Loudon's Highlanders, raised in 1745 and ranked as 64th Foot
- 79th Regiment of Foot (1757), 64th Regiment of Foot, raised in 1757 and renumbered as the 79th
- 64th (2nd Staffordshire) Regiment of Foot, raised in 1758
