= 1756 English cricket season =

Cricket season review

Details have survived of five eleven-a-side matches in the 1756 English cricket season, and one notable single wicket match. All of them are historically important. (Note: Any match listed in the ACS' Important Match Guide (1981) is historically important, and therefore of the highest standard, whether or not a scorecard might exist. The same applies to numerous matches discovered by researchers since 1981. For further information, see First-class cricket.)

The season may be said to mark the beginning of the so-called "Hambledon Era", as the Hambledon team played in three matches against Dartford, one of the strongest teams in the 18th century. Hambledon was then probably run by a parish organisation, rather than by the famous club itself, which is believed to have been formed in about 1765.

The Seven Years' War began in 1756 and ended in 1763. There was a reduction in the number of "great matches" while it lasted, as later happened in the Napoleonic Wars, and in the two World Wars. It is probable that cricket's first bowling revolution occurred sometime during, or soon after, the Seven Years' War. Bowlers were certainly pitching the ball by 1770, but there are no surviving reports to describe the reception that pitching had when it was tried and implemented.

== Dartford v Hambledon ==
Dartford played Hambledon three times in 1756. The date and venue of the first match are unknown. The second match was played 18 August on Broadhalfpenny Down, and the third 30 August on the Artillery Ground. It is known that Dartford won all three matches.

The match on Broadhalfpenny Down is known because of a famous advert in the Reading Mercury newspaper concerning a dog called Rover, whose owner lost him at the match. He was offering five shillings for Rover's return, but it is not known if the dog was recovered. It should be said that the advert does not conclusively prove that Hambledon was playing Dartford that day, but in the light of subsequent reports it seems a more than reasonable assumption.

Nothing is known of the first match except that the last of the three on Monday, 30 August, was billed as "the deciding match between the two elevens", and played for £50 a side. Furthermore, in the Public Advertiser announcement for the London v Dartford match on 6 September, Dartford is said to have "beat Hampshire (sic) 3 matches successively".

== London v Dartford ==
The teams met twice in September, but neither result is known. The first, 6 September on the Artillery Ground, was played for £50 a side. London had John Bryant, Joe Harris, William Durling, and George Smith playing for them. The notice for that match confirmed that the second match would be played 9 September "on Dartford Brim (sic) by the same gentlemen".

== Other events ==
In Dawn of Cricket, H. T. Waghorn records a pre-announcement that a "fives" game involving Hambledon would be played on Saturday, 28 August at the Artillery Ground. The Hambledon players are unnamed but their opponents were a strong team: Tom Faulkner, Joe Harris, John Frame, John Bell, and William Durling. No details of the result were recorded. Stakes were £20 a side. This may have been a curtain-raiser for the main event on Monday, 30 August.

The Seven Years' War began, officially, on 17 May, when Britain formally declared war on France. The impact of this war on cricket can be seen in the ACS' Important Matches booklet. It has only sixteen entries for all seven seasons from 1757 to 1763, with none at all in 1760.

== Bibliography ==
- ACS (1981). A Guide to Important Cricket Matches Played in the British Isles 1709–1863. Nottingham: ACS. OCLC 85045528.
- Maun, Ian (2011). From Commons to Lord's, Volume Two: 1751 to 1770. Leicester: Martin Wilson. ISBN 978-09-56906-60-1.
- Waghorn, H. T. (2005) [1906]. The Dawn of Cricket. London: J. W. McKenzie. ISBN 978-09-47821-17-3.
