= Colchin =

Colchin is a surname. Notable people with the surname include:

- Robert Colchin (1713–1750), English cricketer
- Samuel Colchin (fl. 1747–1779), English cricketer
