= Sir Thomas Miller, 3rd Baronet =

British politician

Sir Thomas Miller, 3rd Baronet (c. 1688–1733) was a British politician who sat in the House of Commons from 1715 to 1727.

Miller was the only son of Sir John Miller, 2nd Baronet and his first wife Margaret Peachey, daughter of John Peachey of Chichester. He matriculated at New College, Oxford on 29 January 1707, aged 18. He married Jane Gother, daughter of Francis Gother, or Goater, alderman of Chichester.

Miller was returned as Member of Parliament for Chichester in a contest at the 1715 general election and retained the seat unopposed at the 1722 general election. He did not stand in 1727. In 1717 he strongly opposed the acquittal of former Tory first minister Robert Harley during his Impeachment trial.

Miller succeeded his father in the baronetcy on 29 November 1721.

Miller died on 6 November 1733. He had three sons and one daughter and was succeeded in the baronetcy by his son John.

Parliament of Great Britain
Preceded by William Elson; James Brudenell	Member of Parliament for Chichester; 1715–1727; With: Sir Richard Farington, Bt 1715-1719; Henry Kelsall 1719-1722; Earl of March1722-1724; Lord William Beauclerk 1724-1727	Succeeded by Lord William Beauclerk; Charles Lumley
Baronetage of England
Preceded by John Miller	Baronet (of Chichester); 1721-1733	Succeeded by John Miller
