= William Peckham =

William Peckham may refer to:

- William Peckham (landowner) (1689–1765), English landowner
- William Pitt Peckham (1836–after 1879), American businessman

== See also ==
- William A. Beckham (1927–2005), American bishop
