= Sheriff of Sussex =

English ceremonial office

The office of Sheriff of Sussex was established before the Norman Conquest. The office of sheriff remained first in precedence in the counties until the reign of Edward VII, when an Order in Council in 1908 gave the Lord-Lieutenant the prime office under the Crown as the Sovereign's personal representative.

At various times, the sheriff of Surrey was also sheriff of Sussex (1229–1231, 1232–1240, 1242–1567, 1571–1635), The office of Sheriff of Sussex ceased with local government reorganisation in 1974, when the county was split for local government purposes into East Sussex (see High Sheriff of East Sussex) and West Sussex (see High Sheriff of West Sussex). The High Sheriffs remain the Sovereign's representative in the County for all matters relating to the Judiciary and the maintenance of law and order.

== List of officeholders ==
Sheriffs of Sussex

William I & II (1066–1100)

- 1086: Gislebertus
- c. 1086: Robert FitzTerbald
- c. 1080–c. 1095: Ralph de Bocco
- c. 1091: E. FitzAuger

Henry I (1100–1135)

- 1100: William, Son of Wilbert
- 1120: William FitzAuger
- 1129–1130: Hugh de Warleville
- 1133: William de Pont de l'Arche

Stephen (1135–1154)

- c. 1145: Ailwin
- c. 1145: Roger Hay

Henry II (1154–1189)

- 1154 Hugh de Warleville
- 1155 Mauger de Maleuvenant
- 1156 Richard de Humez (Paganus)
- 1157–59 Rodophus Picol
- 1160 Ralph Picot
- 1161–62 Hilary, Bishop of Chichester
- 1163 Henry Archdeacon
- 1164–70 Roger Hay
- 1171–76 Reginald de Warenne
- 1177–87 Roger fitzReinfrid
- 1188 William de Ruffus

Richard 1 (1189–1199)

- 1189 Philip Rufus
- 1190–91 Philip de Tresgar
- 1192–93 John Marescal (John Marshal)
- 1194–98 William Marescal
- 1198 Sir Michael de Apletrichan

John (1199–1216)

- 1199 Sir Michael de Apletrichan/ William Marescal
- 1200 Robert de Turnham
- 1201 John Chapter
- 1202 William Marescal
- 1203 Sir Michael de Apletricham/ John Ferles
- 1204–07: William de Chaignes
- 1208: John Fitz Hugonis
- 1209: William Briwere
- 1210: John Fitz Hugonis
- 1211–15:Matthew FitzHerbert

Henry III (1216–1272)

- 1217: Gilbert de Barrier
- 1218: Matthew FitzHerbert
- 1219–24: Gilbert de Barrier, Matthew FitzHerbert & Herbert FitzWalter
- 1225–28: Matthew FitzHerbert & Herbert FitzWalter

=== 1229–1565 ===
Sheriffs of Sussex & Surrey (1229–1565) – See High Sheriff of Surrey

=== 1566–1570 ===
Elizabeth I (1558–1603)

Sheriffs of Sussex only

- 1566: Edward Bellingham
- 1567: John Apsley
- 1568: Henry Goring
- 1569: Edward Carrell
- 1570: John Pelham

=== 1571–1636 ===
Sheriffs of Sussex & Surrey (1571–1636) – See High Sheriff of Surrey

=== 1636–1702 ===
Sheriffs of Sussex only

Charles I (1625–1649) – Continued

- 1636:Sir Edward Bishopp, 2nd Baronet
- 1637:Anthony Fowle
- 1638:Anthony Foster
- 1639:Edward Apsley
- 1640:George Churchar
- 1641:Egid Garton
- 1642:Sir Edward Ford
- 1643:John Baker
- 1644:Edward Paine
- 1645:Sir Thomas Henley
- 1646:Thomas Eversfield
- 1648: Humfrey Stewart
- 1649: Thomas Luxford
- 1650: Peter Courthopp
- 1651: William Palmer
- 1652: William Wilson
- 1657: Edward Blaker of Buckingham House, Old Shoreham
- 1658: Samuel Gott of Battle

Charles II (1660–1685)

- 1664: William Spence
- 1665: John Morley
- 12 November 1665: Robert Fowle
- 7 November 1666: John Farrington, of Chichester
- 15 November 1666: Sir John Morley
- 6 November 1667: Sir Anthony Shirley, 1st Baronet
- 9 November 1667: Sir William Greene, 1st Baronet
- 6 November 1668: Richard Stringer
- 11 November 1669: Walter Doble
- 4 November 1670: John Fuller
- 16 November 1670: Thomas Collins
- 9 November 1671: William Kempe
- 11 November 1672: Robert Heath
- 13 June 1673: John Fuller
- 12 November 1673: Francis Wyatt
- 9 March 1674: Isaac Honeywood
- 5 November 1674: Thomas Millington
- 12 November 1674: Thankful Hebden
- 25 November 1674: John Spence, of Lindfield
- 15 November 1675: Richard Payne, of Lewis
- 10 November 1676: George Kilner
- 18 November 1676: John Honey, of Ditcheling
- 15 November 1677: James Butler
- 23 November 1677: John Boarde, of Lindfield
- 14 November 1678: Thomas Woodere
- 23 November 1678: Thomas Smith
- 13 November 1679: William Pelham, of Salehurst
- 25 November 1679: George Luxford, of Hellingby
- 4 November 1680: Thomas Arnold
- 1682: Henry Goring
- 1683: Edward Selwyn of Friston
- 1684: Robert Mitchell of Horsham, Sussex and Petersfield, Hants.

James II (1685–1689)

- 1685: Sir Thomas Dyke
- 1686: ?John Fuller
- 1687: Humphrey Fowle
- 1688: Sir John Gage, Bt

William & Mary (1689–1702)

- 1689: Peter Gott
- 1690: George Courthopp
- 1691: Henry Yeates
- 1692: John Newman
- 1693: John Gratwicke
- 1694: Sir John Brisco replaced by John Cooke of Petworth (17–30 Nov) replaced by William Pellatt
- 1695: Richard Stanley or Lee
- 1696: Joseph Studley replaced by Richard Leaves of Arundel
- 1696: Francis Wyatt
- 1697: Richard Farington, Bt of South St, Chichester
- 1698: Humphry Duke replaced by John Cheale
- 1699: Henry Bray
- 1699: John Ward
- 1700: Thomas Woodyer
- 1701: John Barham
- 1701: Thomas Alchorne

=== 1702–1799 ===
Anne (1702–1714)
- 1702: John Ellis
- 1703: Henry Collins
- 1703: Samuel Blunt
- 1704: Richard Bridger
- 1705: Arthur Turner
- 1706: John Shelley
- 1707: Sir John Miller, 2nd Baronet of North St, Chichester
- 1708: Allan Wallis
- 1708: John Young
- 1709: John Baker
- 1710: William Knight (previously Woodward) of West Dean, near Midhurst
- 1711: Hugh Reason
- 1712: Henry Collins
- 1712: Francis Hamlyn
- 1714: Nicholas Turner

George I (1714–1727)

- 1715: James Smyth of Isfield
- 1716: Charles Goodwin of Rowfant
- 1716: John Watson
- 1717: John Laker
- 1718: William Peckham, of Salehurst
- 1719: Henry Shelley, Jnr.
- 1720: Thomas Dennett of Woodmancote
- 1721: William Markwick
- 1722: Sir Thomas Peckham
- 1723: John Mitchell of Waldron
- 1724: Thomas Fuller of Park Gate
- 1725: Thomas William Brereton
- 1726: James Colebrooke
- 1727: James Nicholl of Munfield,
- 1728: Thomas Shadwell

George II (1727–1760)

- 1729: Isaac Honeywood of Sunningley
- 1730: Ogle Riggs
- 1731: John Borde of Paxhill
- 1732: George Naldret of Naldret
- 1733: Raymond Blackmore of Bayly
- 1734: Henry Montague of Boareham
- 1735: William Stone
- 1736: Bernard Lintot
- 1737: Edward Madgick of Tillington
- 1738: Edward Parker of West Terring
- 1739: George Spencer
- 1740: John Payne of Leggsheath
- 1741: John Nicholl
- 1742: Edward Tredcroft
- 1743: John Dennett of Bolney
- 1744: John Edwards of Mayfield
- 1745: John Napper of Highs
- 1746: Thomas Ridge of Trotton
- 1747: Timothy Shelley of Wort
- 1748: George Luxford
- 1749: John Fuller of Heathfield
- 1750: Peckham Williams of Chichester
- 1751: Robert Bull of Chichester
- 1752: William Watson of Ticehurst
- 1753: Robert Randall of Herrings
- 1754: Walter Barttelot of Stopham
- 1755: John Major of East Grinstead
- 1756: Joseph Calverley of the Broad
- 1757: John Ward of Champions
- 1758: James Goble, of Petworth
- 1759: John Margesson of Offington

George III (1760–1820)

- 1760: John Aldridge
- 1761: Sir William Thomas, 2nd Baronet
- 1762: Thomas Granger
- 1763: Thomas Fowle
- 1764: John Payne
- 1765: Samuel Lewes
- 1766: John Burgess
- 1767: James Wood, of Hicksted
- 1768: John Paine
- 1769: John Laker
- 1770: William Westbrooke Richardson of West Tarring
- 1771: William Richardson of Milland
- 1772: William Gratwicke
- 1773: Kemble Whateley
- 1774: George Peckham
- 1775: Thomas Baker
- 1776: Edward Hutchinson
- 1777: Thomas Kemp of Lewes Castle, Sussex
- 1778: Colville Bridger
- 1779: John Harrison
- 1780: Sir John Bridger of Coombe Place
- 1781: William Peachey
- 1782: William Frankland
- 1783: John Norton
- 1784: Thomas Dennett
- 1785: William Nelthorpe, of Sedgwick Park
- 1786: Francis Sergison of Cuckfield
- 1787: Richard Wyatt of Trimmings
- 1788: John Bean of Littleington
- 1789: Sir Ferdinando Poole of Lewes
- 1790: Henry Manning of Southover
- 1791: John Drew of Chichester
- 1792: Edmund Woods of Shopwick
- 1793: Thomas Richardson of Warminghurst
- 1794: Samuel Twyford of Trotton
- 1795: Francis Newbery of Heathfield Park
- 1796: John Fuller of Rosehill
- 1797: Charles Scrase-Dickins of Brighthelmston
- 1798: Richard Streatfield of Uckfield
- 1799: James Pigou of Frant

=== 1800–1899 ===
- 5 February 1800: Thomas Carr, of Beddingham
- 11 February 1801: William Borrer, of Hurstpierpoint
- 3 February 1802: Sir William Ashburnham, 5th Baronet, of Broomham
- 3 February 1803: William Margesson, of Offington, replaced 16 February 1803 by John William Commerell, of Strood
- 1 February 1804: John Dennett, of Woodmancote
- 6 February 1805: William Margesson, of Offington
- 1 February 1806: William Gorringe, of Kingston by Sea
- 4 February 1807: John Micklethwait, of Iridge Place
- 3 February 1808: William Stanford, of Preston
- 6 February 1809: Thomas Tourle, of Landport
- 31 January 1810: Richard Wyatt, of Courtwick
- 8 February 1811: William Darling, of Donnington
- 24 January 1812: George Francis Tyson, of Singleton
- 10 February 1813: Edward Napper, of Ifold
- 7 March 1814: Thomas Peckham Phipps, of Compton
- 13 February 1815: Richard Watt Walker, of Michelgrove
- 1816: James Ingram
- 1817: James Cranborne Strode of Frant
- 1818: John King of Loxwood
- 1819: John Wood of Chesham

George IV (1820–1830)

- 1820: William Campion of Danny
- 1821: Richard Hasler
- 1822: James Eversfield
- 1823: Richard Prime
- 1824: Daniel Rowland
- 1825: James Slater
- 1826: John Hawkins
- 1827: Sir Charles Forster Goring, 7th Baronet
- 1828: Robert Aldridge of New Lodge
- 1829: Sir Charles Lamb, 2nd Baronet of Beauport, near Battle
- 1830: Thomas Sanctuary, of Rusper
- 1831: William Courthope Mabbett, of Uckfield
- 1832: Alexander Donovan, of Framfield Park
- 1833: Thomas Broadwood, of Beeding
- 1834: Robert Curzon, of Parham Park
- 1835: Charles Dixon, of Stanstead Park
- 1836: John James King, of Coates
- 1837: George Palmer, of Tunbridge Wells
- 1838: George Henry Malcolm Wagner, of Herstmonceux
- 1839: Thomas Frewen, of Brickwall House, Northam
- 1840: John Davies Gilbert, of Eastbourne
- 1841: Sir Richard Hunter, of Patching
- 1842: George Wyndham, of Petworth House
- 1843: Musgrave Brisco, of Coghurst
- 1844: Edward Hussey, of Scotney Castle
- 1845: James Baril Daubuz, of Offington
- 1846: William Townley Mitford, of Pitshill
- 1847: William Gratwicke Kinleside Gratwicke, of Ham
- 1848: Sir Peckham Micklethwait, 1st Baronet, of Iridge Place
- 1849: Richard Shuttleworth Streatfeild, of the Rocks, Uckfield
- 1850: George Campion Courthope, of Wiligh
- 1851: David Lyon, of Goring
- 1852: Philip Salomons, of Brighton
- 1853: Francis Barchard, of Horsted Place
- 1854: John Day, of Newick
- 1855: George Carew Gibson, of Sandgate Lodge, near Steyning
- 1856: William Drew Lucas Shadwell, of Fair Light Hall, near Hastings
- 1857: Richard Curteis Pomfret, of Rye
- 1858: Edward Smith Bigg, of the Hyde, Slaugham
- 1859: William Henry Blaauw, of Beechlands, Newick
- 1860: Charles Scrase Dickins, of Coolhurst
- 1861: George Gatty, of Felbridge Park, East Grinstead
- 1862: John Jervis Carnegie, of Fair Oak, Rogate
- 1863: John Charles Fletcher, of Dale Park, Arundel
- 1864: William Leyland Woods, of Chilgrove, Chichester
- 1865: Sir Percy Shelley, 3rd Baronet, of Boscombe, Christchurch
- 1866: John Hankey
- 1867: Colonel Francis Harcourt
- 1868: Henry Peter Crofts of the Abbotts, Sompting
- 1869: Colonel George Kirwan Carr Lloyd
- 1870: Joseph Mayer Montefiore
- 1871: Sir Walter Burrell, 5th Baronet
- 1872: Sir James Duke, 1st Baronet
- 1873: Sir Charles William Blunt, 6th Baronet, of Heathfield Park
- 1874: George Meek, of Brantridge, Cuckfield
- 1875: William Egerton Hubbard, of St. Leonard's Lodge, Horsham
- 1876: William Courtenay Morland, of Court Lodge, Lamberhurst
- 1877: Robert Loder of The High Beeches, Crawley
- 1878: Louis Huth, of Possingworth Manor, Uckfield
- 1879: Charles Thomas Lucas, of Warnham Court, Horsham
- 1880: Anthony John Wright Biddulph, of Burton Park,
- 1881: James Kennedy Esdaile, of Saint Hill Place, East Grinstead,
- 1882: Donald Larnach, of Brambletye, East Grinstead,
- 1883: Sir George Rendlesham Prescott, 4th Baronet, of Isenhurst, Mayfield
- 1884: Hugh Wyatt, of Cissbury Findon,
- 1885: Henry Ray Freshfield, of Kidbrooke Park, East Grinstead,
- 1886: Frederick S. Shenstone, of Sutton Hall, Burcombe,
- 1887: Lieutenant – Colonel Thomas Faulconer Wisden, of The Warren, Broadwater.
- 1888: Lieutenant – Colonel James Clifton Brown, of Holmbush, Horsham.
- 1889: Sir Spencer Maryon Maryon-Wilson, Bt., of Searles, Fletching,
- 1890: Robert Thornton, of High Cross, Framfield
- 1891: Wilfrid Hans Loder, of the High Beeches, Slaugham, Crawley
- 1892: Philip Rawson, of Woodhurst, Crawley
- 1893: James Innes, of Roffey Park, Horsham
- 1894: Charles John Fletcher, of Dale Park, Madehurst, Arundel
- 1895: Sir Francis Abraham Montefiore, 1st Baronet, of Worth Park
- 1896: Edward Huth, of Wykehurst, Bolney, Hayward's Heath,
- 1897: William Dodge James, of West Dean Park, Chichester,
- 1898: Sir Henry Harben, Kt., of Warnham Lodge, Warnham
- 1899: Captain Richard Hamilton Rawson, of Woodhurst, Crawley.

=== 1900–1973 ===
- 1900: Robert Lawrence Thornton, of High Cross, Framfield
- 1901: Charles Egerton Legge, of Ashling House, Chichester,
- 1902: Alfred Henry Burton, of St. Leonard's Lodge, St.Leonard's-on-Sea,
- 1903: Edwin Henty, of Ferring Grange, Worthing,
- 1904: Charles James Lucas, of Warnham Court, Horsham,
- 1905: Hugh Richard Penfold Wyatt, of Cissbury, Findon, Worthing,
- 1906: Philip Secretan
- 1907: Douglas Bernard Hall of Burton Park, Petworth
- 1908: Sir Alfred Dent
- 1909: John Waddingon
- 1910: James Buchanan
- 1911: John Ashburner Nix
- 1912: William Barrott Montfort Bird
- 1913: Sir John Luscombe of Hay Heath, Worth, Kt.
- 1914: James Hull Renton
- 1915: Colonel Stephenson Robert-Clarke of Borde Hill, Cuckfield
- 1916: William Herbert Mullens
- 1917: Lt-Colonel Alexander Sutherland-Harris
- 1918: Sir Merrik Raymond Burrell, 7th Baronet
- 1919: George Mallows Freeman
- 1920: William Footner Foster
- 1921: Francis Barchard
- 1922: Stanley Martyn Dennis
- 1923: Frederick John Francis Wootton Isaacson
- 1924: Sir Stephenson Hamilton Kent
- 1925: Lt Cmdr Hugh Sydney Egerton
- 1926: Lieut.-Col. Roland Vaughan Gwynne, of Folkington Manor, Polegate
- 1927: Sir Edward Boyle, 2nd Baronet
- 1928: Sir Robert Kindersley
- 1929: Captain Guy Vernon Baxendale
- 1930: Ronald Olaf Hambro
- 1931: Philip Staveley Foster
- 1932: Brig-General Desmond Beale-Browne
- 1933: Lt-Colonel Robert Wilson McKergow of Twineham Grange, Haywards Heath
- 1934: Thomas Percy Tew
- 1935: William Henry Abbey
- 1936: Lt-Colonel Leonard Charles Messel
- 1937: Major Aubrey du Plat Thorold Cole
- 1938: Brevet Colonel John Raymond Warren
- 1939: Anthony Mallows Freeman
- 1940: Clive Bernard Pearson
- 1941: Edmund Stephenson Clarke
- 1942: Lt Colonel Giles Harold Loder
- 1943: Edwin Fisher
- 1944: Basil Ionides
- 1945: Major John Roland Abbey of Greyfriars, Storrington.
- 1946: Giles Fendall Newton
- 1947: Colonel Walter Churchill Hale
- 1948: Sir Giles Rolls Loder, 3rd Baronet
- 1949: Sir Stephen Demetriadi
- 1950: Robert Strickland Gilbert Scott
- 1951: Lt Cmdr Herbert Robert Hardy
- 1952: Captain Lord Rupert Charles Montacute Nevill, of Uckfield House, Uckfield.
- 1953: Captain (S) Edwin Howard Wethey, of Mountsfield, Rye.
- 1954: Cornelius William Shelford of Chailey Place, near Lewes
- 1955: Gavin Astor, 2nd Baron Astor of Hever
- 1956: Henry Swanston Eeles of Sandyden House, Mark Cross, near Crowborough
- 1957: Major Roger Wilby Hall, of Glebe House, West Grinstead.
- 1958: Air-Commodore George Bentley Dacre, of The Downings, Bazehill Road, Rottingdean.
- 1959: Thomas Calderwood Dundas, of The Old Rectory, Slaugham, Handcross.
- 1960: John Edward Reginald Wyndham, of Petworth House, Petworth.
- 1961: Frank Leslie John Rogerson, of Guildenhurst Manor, Billingshurst.
- 1962: Lieutenant-Colonel John Derek Hornung, of Ivorys, Cowfold.
- 1963: Major William Lloyd Baxendale, of Hailwell House, Framfield.
- 1964: Sir Richard James Boughey, Bt., of Ringmer Park, Ringmer.
- 1965: Brigadier Geoffrey Paul Hardy-Roberts, of The Mill House, Fittleworth.
- 1966: Patrick Forrester John Colvin, of Woldringfold, Horsham.
- 1967: Major Michael Grissell, of Brightling Park, Robertsbridge.
- 1968: Commander William Francis Roderick Segrave, of Isfield Place, Isfield.
- 1969: Ian Voase Askew, of Wellingham House, near Lewes.
- 1970: Michael Raymond Warren, of Banks Farm, Barcombe.
- 1971: John Richard Greenwood, of Stone Hall, Balcombe.
- 1972: Ralph Ernest Watkins Grubb, of Mayes House, near East Grinstead.
- 1973: Major John Derek Wigan, of Drewitts, Warninglid.
- 1974 onwards –See High Sheriff of East Sussex and High Sheriff of West Sussex
