= Thomas Hay (Lewes MP) =

British Army officer and politician

Thomas Hay (1733–1786) was a British Army officer and politician who sat in the House of Commons from 1768 to 1780.

== Early life and army ==
Hay was the eldest son of William Hay of Glyndebourne, Sussex and his wife Elizabeth Pelham, daughter of Thomas Pelham MP of Catsfield Place, Sussex and was born on 3 July 1733. He was educated at Westminster School in 1747. He joined the army and was Cornet in the 9th Dragoons in 1751, Lieutenant in the 7th Dragoons in 1755 and captain in 1757. He served on the raid on Cherbourg in 1758 and was in Germany, as aide-de-camp to Granby from 1759 to 1763. He became a Major in 1761 and Lieutenant-Colonel in 1765. He also studied at University of Göttingen.

== Political career ==
In 1768 the Duke of Newcastle chose Hay as candidate for Lewes but later changed his mind. However Hay had already canvassed the town and been promised support. He was elected Member of Parliament for Lewes in the 1768 general election. In 1774 he stood at Lewes on his own interest and was returned. He stood again in 1780 but was defeated and did not stand in 1784. There is no indication that he ever spoke in Parliament.

== Later life ==
Hay was described by George Hardinge as “a modest, virtuous, respectable, and sensible man; with no brilliancy of talent, but with a high sense of honour”. He died unmarried on 9 February 1786.

Parliament of Great Britain
Preceded by Lord Edward Bentinck; William Plumer	Member of Parliament for Lewes; 1768–1780; With: Thomas Hampden; Sir Thomas Miller, Bt	Succeeded by Henry Pelham; Thomas Kemp
