= Micklethwait baronets =

Extinct baronetcy in the Baronetage of the United Kingdom

Escutcheon of the Micklethwait baronets

The Micklethwait baronetcy, of Iridge Place in the County of Sussex, was a title in the Baronetage of the United Kingdom. It was created on 27 July 1838 for Peckham Micklethwait. The baronetcy was in honour of his having rescued Princess Victoria when her carriage bolted during a visit to Hastings in 1834.

Micklethwait served as High Sheriff of Sussex in 1848. The title became extinct on his death in 1853.

== Micklethwait baronets, of Iridge Place (1838) ==
- Sir (Sotherton Branthwayt) Peckham Micklethwait, 1st Baronet (1786–1853)

Baronetage of the United Kingdom
Preceded by Howard baronets	Micklethwait baronets of Iridge Place; 27 July 1838	Succeeded by Dunlop baronets
