= Sir Thomas Miller, 6th Baronet =

Sir Thomas Combe Miller, 6th Baronet (1781 – 29 June 1864), was an English clergyman and landowner. He was educated at St John's College, Cambridge.

== Life ==
The second but eldest surviving son of Sir Thomas Miller, 5th Baronet, Miller became a Church of England priest and Vicar of Froyle, Hampshire, in 1811. He was largely responsible for the rebuilding of the nave of the parish church in 1812. He had an elder brother, John Miller, who died in 1804, so in 1816 he inherited the family seat, Froyle Place, becoming both Vicar and Lord of the manor of Froyle. For many years he had a curate named Aubutin who took care of the stained glass in the church.

On 24 February 1820, when an election for the Hampshire county constituency was approaching, Miller wrote to George Purefoy-Jervoise, a successful candidate, to say that he would be away on polling day but would use his influence among his tenants to secure votes for Jervoise.

Between 1803 and 1805, Miller was buying several pieces of land in Holybourne. In 1846, he expanded his estate by buying a property near his Park at Froyle, described as: "The Shrubbery, Froyle, comprising a dwelling house with outhouses, outbuildings gardens, lawn, a shrubbery, plantation and 2 pieces of meadow or pasture... along with coach houses, stables and other buildings with a yard and adjoining land.

As well as Froyle, he inherited and was lord of the manors of Ludshott, which he sold in 1825 for £17,000, and Fishbourne in Sussex, which he sold to Edward Stanford.

Miller's grandson, Sir Hubert Miller, said of him in 1936, "My grandfather hunted hard to hounds and drank two bottles of port with his dinner. I wonder he wasn’t sick." It was also reported that on hot Sunday mornings the sixth Baronet would smash the church windows with his walking stick to let air in.

== Family ==
On 5 May 1824, Miller married Martha, daughter of the Rev. John Holmes. They had five sons, Sir Charles Hayes Miller, 7th Baronet (1829–1868), Sir Henry John Miller (born 1830), who became Speaker of the New Zealand Legislative Council, Major Thomas Edmund Miller (born 1832), George Miller CB (born 1833), Assistant Secretary in the Education Department, and Richard Combe Miller JP DL (born 1841); and three daughters, Marianne, Frances Margaret, and Georgina Emily.

== Notes ==
Baronetage of England
Preceded by Thomas Miller	Baronet (of Chichester); 1772–1816	Succeeded by Charles Hayes Miller
