= Harry Peckham =

English cricketer (1740–1787)

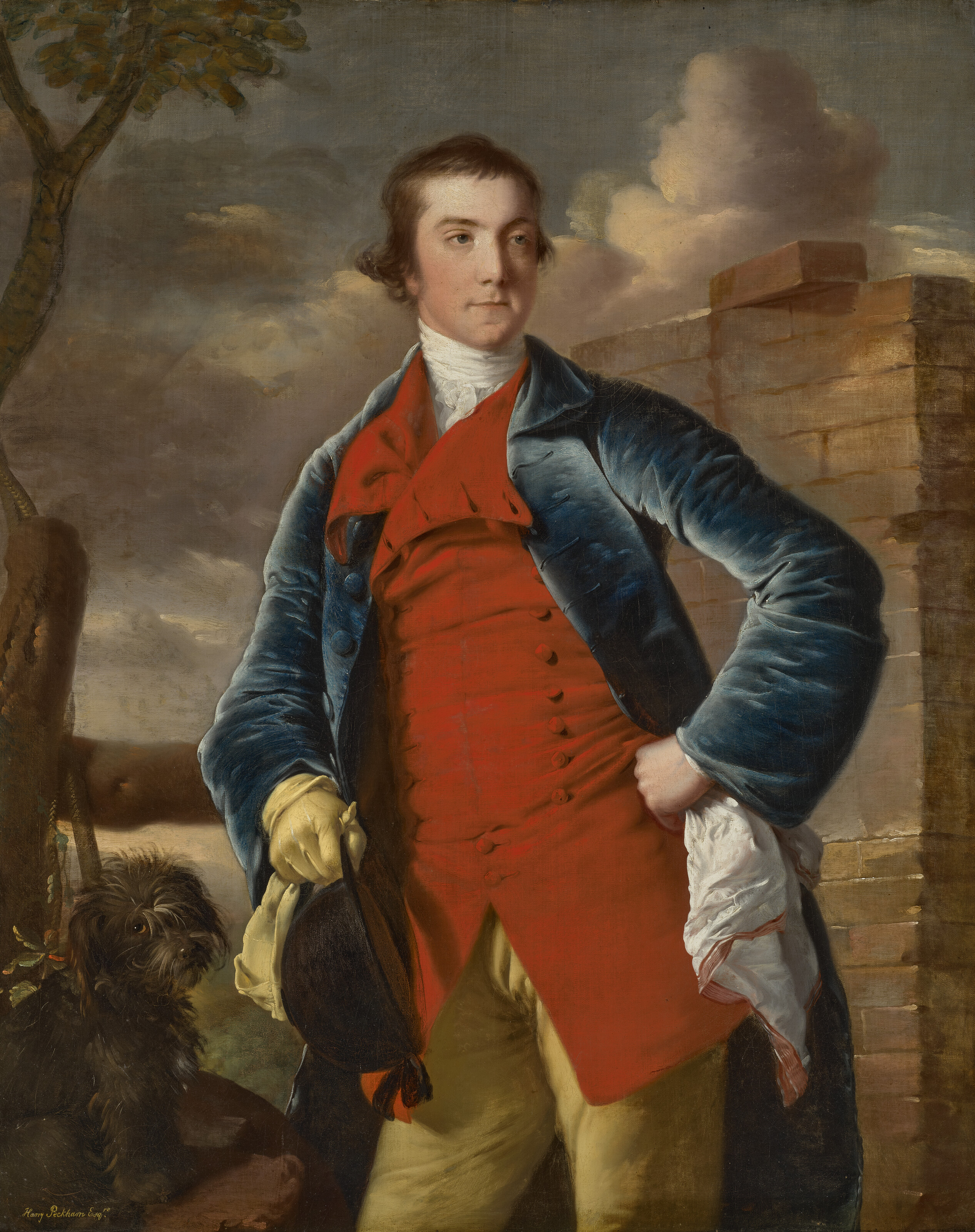
- Harry Peckham in the livery of the Markeaton Hunt, painting by Joseph Wright of Derby, 1762/63
- Born: 1740
- Died: 10 January 1787 (aged 46–47)
- Resting place: Temple Church
- Education: Winchester and New College, Oxford
- Occupations: Lawyer, writer
- Political party: Whig
- Parent(s): Rev. Henry and Sarah Peckham

Harry Peckham (1740 – 10 January 1787) was a King's Counsel, judge and sportsman who toured Europe and wrote a series of letters which are still being published over 200 years later. Peckham was a member of the committee that drew up early laws of cricket including the first inclusion of the leg before wicket (lbw) rule. The diarist James Woodforde makes reference to Peckham playing cricket at Oxford in 1760. and he was still playing in 1771.

== Biography ==
Peckham was the only son of the Reverend Henry Peckham (1712-1795), then curate of Edburton but later rector of Amberley and of Tangmere, by his wife Sarah (1702-1784), daughter of Thomas Norton of Hurstpierpoint. He had two younger sisters: Sarah (1742-1819), who in 1784 married the Reverend George Parker Farhill, and Fanny who only lived a few days in 1744. He was christened in his mother's church of the Holy Trinity, Hurstpierpoint, on 7 August 1740. Sir Thomas Peckham was his first cousin once removed and Henry Peckham (MP for Chichester) a first cousin three times removed.

He was a contemporary of diarist James Woodforde at school ( Winchester College) and at New College, Oxford, where he was also a friend of Francis Noel Clarke Mundy. Woodforde makes reference to Peckham playing cricket at Oxford in 1760 and 1761.

Peckham was a member of the private Markeaton Hunt. In 1762–63, his friend Mundy commissioned a set of six portraits. Each of the subjects was in the distinctive dress of the Markeaton Hunt, consisting of a blue coat over a scarlet waistcoat and yellow breeches. Peckham sat for one of these paintings. The paintings hung at Mundy's ancestral home, Markeaton Hall. As well as the Wright portrait, Peckham sat for Romney and one canvas in the possession of Chichester City Council which hangs in the Chichester Council House. Another canvas, now classed as « after Romney », is in the Royal Collection.

Peckham entered Middle Temple in 1764 and was called on 29 January 1768. In the same year he toured through Rotterdam, The Hague, Amsterdam, Antwerp, Brussels, Ghent, Paris, Rouen, and Calais. His letters home were published by George Kearsley among a number of travel books Kearsley published in London. Peckham's writings were and are still considered witty and interesting.

His book records a view of Europe before the political upheavals and is considered to give a Whiggish view of how the Netherlands was a successful outcome of the union of liberty, commerce and Protestantism.

The first edition of his book in 1772 was anonymous and only the fourth posthumous edition of 1788 was attributed to Peckham.

Peckham continued to play cricket as it seems likely that he was the "Mr Peckam [sic], jun" who played for the Gentlemen of Sussex against the Gentlemen of Hampshire at Broadhalfpenny Down on 20 August 1771.

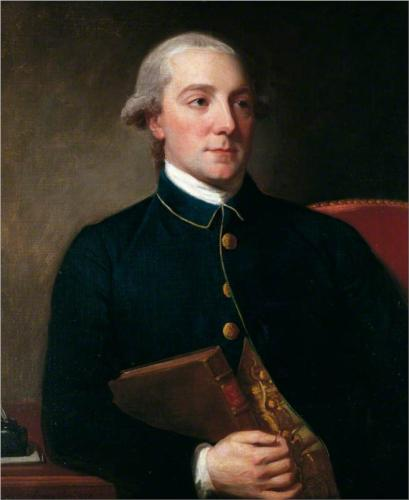
Harry Peckham, Recorder of Chichester in 1785 by George Romney

In 1774, Peckham sat on the committee that formulated some early laws of cricket. They were settled and revised at the Star and Garter in Pall Mall on Friday 25 February 1774. The meeting was chaired by Sir William Draper and the committee included the Duke of Dorset, the Earl of Tankerville and other "Noblemen and Gentlemen of Kent, Hampshire, Surrey, Sussex, Middlesex, and London". This meeting agreed one of the earlier sets of cricket rules and is acknowledged as being the first where the leg before wicket rule was introduced.

In 1781, Peckham was junior counsel to the former attorney-general John Dunning in the unsuccessful defence of François Henri de la Motte accused of supplying naval secrets to the French.

Dunning was taken ill during the trial and Peckham found himself having to conduct the defence in a case that is said to have been the inspiration for the trial of Charles Darnay in the Charles Dickens novel A Tale of Two Cities.

On 22 May 1783, Peckham wrote to the prime minister 3rd Duke of Portland from the Inner Temple thanking him for his 'Interposition in my favour'. He was called to the bench on 20 June 1783. Once eligible as a judge, he was appointed Recorder of Chichester, a post he held until his death on 10 January 1787 after a fall from his horse while hunting on the estate of the Duke of Richmond at Goodwood. His burial at the Temple Church was on 19 January 1787.

He was survived by his father, who was his executor, by his sister and by his illegitimate daughter, Sarah, born 3 May 1771. His will dated 29 September 1784 was proved on 12 April 1787.

In it, he appointed three guardians for his daughter, one being his sister Sarah. The young woman objected to being under the tutelage of her aunt and in the Chancery case of Peckham v Peckham [2 Cox, 46] the Lord Chancellor agreed. Her subsequent career is so far unknown.

His name was added to a white marble monument erected on the north wall of Chichester Cathedral, noting that he was Recorder of Chichester. This monument had been created for Peckham's parents by his sister, Sarah Farhill. Mrs Farhill was anxious to keep the name of Peckham alive and made her second cousin once removed, Charles Peckham Smith (1801-1873), her legatee if he would assume the name and arms of Peckham. This he did in 1820, becoming Charles Peckham Peckham.

== Major works ==
- Harry Peckham's Tour, Harry Peckham & Martin Brayne (editor), The History Press, ISBN 978-1-84588-619-6
