= Henry Pelham (British Army officer) =

British officer and politician

Henry Pelham (1759–1797) was a British Army officer and politician, Member of Parliament for Lewes from 1780 to 1796.

== Life ==
He was the second son of Thomas Pelham, 1st Earl of Chichester and his wife Anne Frankland, daughter of the Thirsk Member of Parliament Frederick Meinhardt Frankland, son of Sir Thomas Frankland, 2nd Baronet; Thomas Pelham, 2nd Earl of Chichester was his elder brother. He was educated at Westminster School, and joined the 3rd Foot Guards in 1775.

In the 1780s, still a serving army officer, Pelham was returned to parliament at Lewes, where his family had an electoral interest. Initially he replaced Sir Thomas Miller, 5th Baronet. To 1790, he took no part in debates. At the time of the 1790 general election he was in poor health and out of the country, but was still returned. He retired as a soldier in 1792, with the rank of lieutenant-colonel. Convalescence in England did not restore him to full health. He stood down as an MP in 1796, and died the following year. Initially a Whig, he became a supporter of William Pitt the younger's administration.

== Family ==
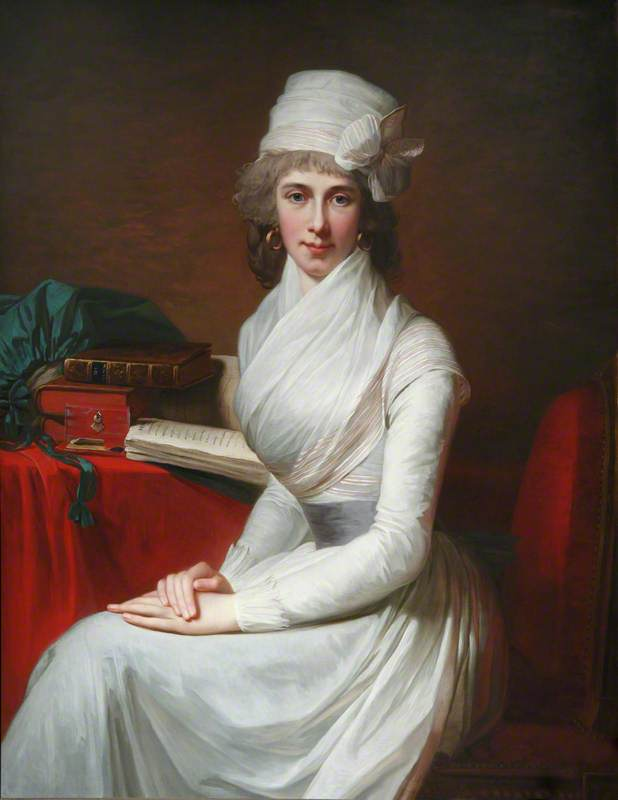
Catherine Pelham, 1792 portrait

Pelham married in 1788 Catherine Cobbe, daughter of Thomas Cobbe, Member of the Irish Parliament for Swords. They had three daughters.
