= William Draper (British Army officer) =

British Army officer and cricketeer

Lieutenant-General Sir William Draper KB
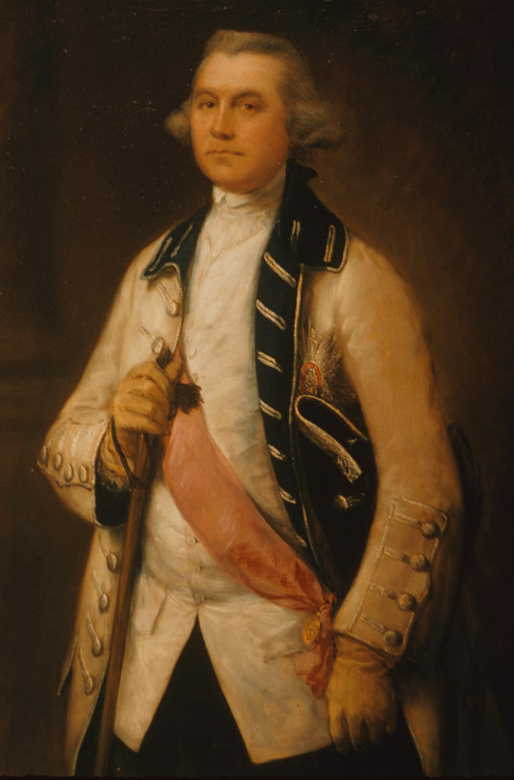
- Portrait by Thomas Gainsborough, c. 1765
- Born: 1721; Bristol, England
- Died: 8 January 1787 (aged 65–66); England
- Resting place: Bath Abbey
- Education: King's College, Cambridge
- Spouse(s): Caroline Beauclerk; Susanna De Lancey
- Military career
- Allegiance: Great Britain
- Branch: British Army
- Service years: 1744–1787
- Rank: Lieutenant-General
- Unit: 79th Regiment of Foot
- Conflicts: War of the Austrian Succession; Seven Years' War; Battle of Manila; American Revolutionary War; Invasion of Menorca

Lieutenant-General Sir William Draper KB (1721 – 8 January 1787) was a British Army officer who led the expedition which captured Manila in 1762 during the Seven Years' War. Later during the American War of Independence he played a more controversial role in the spirited but unsuccessful defence of Menorca as the island's second in command to James Murray. Draper took a keen interest in the early sport of cricket in England and played a role in the 1774 meeting which agreed on an early set of cricket rules including the leg before wicket rule.

== Biography ==
Draper was born in Bristol, then the second largest city in England, to a young customs officer. His father died the following year and the family struggled financially for many years, spending some time in British India. Draper was educated at Bristol Cathedral School, then Eton, to which he won a scholarship in 1733, and King's College, Cambridge. In 1744, during the War of the Austrian Succession, he was joined the British Army at the rank of ensign in Lord Henry Beauclerk's regiment. Draper was appointed as an adjutant in the 1st Regiment of Foot Guards in 1746, and rose to the ranks of lieutenant and captain in 1749. In 1756 he married his first wife, Caroline, daughter of Lord William Beauclerk. He married his second wife, Elizabeth March sometime afterwards, until she forsook him in Bombay, 1773 due to her dislike of him.

== Seven Years' War ==
In the Seven Years' War he commanded the 79th Regiment of Foot, raised by himself, at the Siege of Madras from 1758 to 1759. A colonel in 1762, he had his greatest triumph when he led together with Royal Navy officer Samuel Cornish an expedition against Spanish-held Manila, capturing the city on 6 October 1762. The British occupation of Manila lasted until 1764, after which it was returned to Spain. During the capture Draper had signed an agreement, known as the "Manila Ransom", by which the Spanish would pay the British a large amount of money. News of Manila's capture arrived too late to affect the Treaty of Paris, and under its terms the British returned the city to the Spanish, the ransom being only 1/4th paid.

== Peacetime ==
Draper returned home expecting to receive commendations for his capture of Manila, but the reaction was more mixed. In 1765 he was colonel of the 16th Regiment of Foot. In December 1765 he became Knight Companion of the Order of the Bath and defended the Marquis of Granby against Junius in 1769. In 1769 he lost his wife and went on a tour through the American colonies. In North America, he married Susanna De Lancey, daughter of Oliver De Lancey, the head of one of the leading families in the Province of New York. Draper entertained a hope that he might be appointed as a Royal Governor, but this came to nothing. In 1774, Draper chaired the committee that formulated some early laws of cricket. They were settled and revised at the Star and Garter in Pall Mall on Friday 25 February 1774. The committee included the Duke of Dorset, the Earl of Tankerville, Harry Peckham and other "Noblemen and Gentlemen of Kent, Hampshire, Surrey, Sussex, Middlesex, and London". This meeting was one of the earlier sets of cricket rules and is acknowledged as being the first where the leg before wicket rule was introduced.

== American Revolutionary War ==
A lieutenant-general in 1777, he became lieutenant-governor of Menorca, 1779–1782, until the island was captured by a combined Franco-Spanish expedition during the invasion of Menorca. He preferred unsubstantiated charges of misconduct against Lieutenant General James Murray, who had suspended him. He was reprimanded by a general court-martial in 1783. He died on 8 January 1787 and was buried in the old Abbey Church in Bath, where a monument has been erected to his memory.

== Sources ==
- Pitt's Gallant Conqueror
- NY Times
