= William the Younger =

William the Younger may refer to:

- William Peverel the Younger (c. 1080–1155), son of William Peverel
- William of Jülich (died 1304), known as the Younger
- William IV, Duke of Brunswick-Lüneburg (c. 1425–1503), called William the Younger
- William the Younger, Duke of Brunswick-Lüneburg (1535–1592)
- William Alexander (the younger) (c. 1602–1638), founder of the Scottish colony at Port-Royal
- William Cawley (younger) (born c. 1628), English lawyer and politician
- William Faithorne the Younger (1656–1701?), English mezzotint engraver
- William Morgan (of Tredegar, younger) (1725–1763), Welsh politician
- William Pitt the Younger (1759–1806), British statesman
- William Heberden the Younger (1767–1845), British physician
- William Godwin the Younger (1803–1832), English reporter and author
- William Holl the Younger (1807–1871), English portrait and figure engraver
- William Urwick the younger (1826–1905), Anglo-Irish nonconformist minister and antiquarian chronicler
