= Thomas Peckham =

English landowner and High Sheriff of Sussex

Sir Thomas Peckham (1691–1724) was an English landowner who served as High Sheriff of Sussex.

== Life ==
Baptised on 11 December 1691 at the church of St Mary in Aldingbourne, he was the only son of Thomas Peckham (1666-1724) and his first wife Joyce (1664–1701), daughter of Thomas Peckham of Nyton (1638–1709) and his first wife Mary. He was first cousin twice removed of Sir Henry Peckham, MP for Chichester, and first cousin once removed of Harry Peckham, Recorder of Chichester.

On 6 April 1715 he entered into a marriage settlement, on 9 May 1715 he obtained a licence and on 11 May 1715 at the church of the Holy Trinity in Bosham he married Elizabeth (1676–1733), daughter of Barnham Dobell and his wife Grisel.

From his maternal grandfather he inherited the estate of Nyton at Aldingbourne, where he served as churchwarden in 1716. In December 1721 he was appointed High Sheriff of Sussex and on 31 August 1722 he was knighted at the house of Richard Lumley, 2nd Earl of Scarbrough.

Only 33 when he died on 17 January 1724, he was buried on 23 January 1724 in the church of St Nicholas at Arundel and his will of 28 November 1723 was proved on 28 April 1724. He was survived by his widow, who in 1728 remarried, and by his only remaining son Richard.

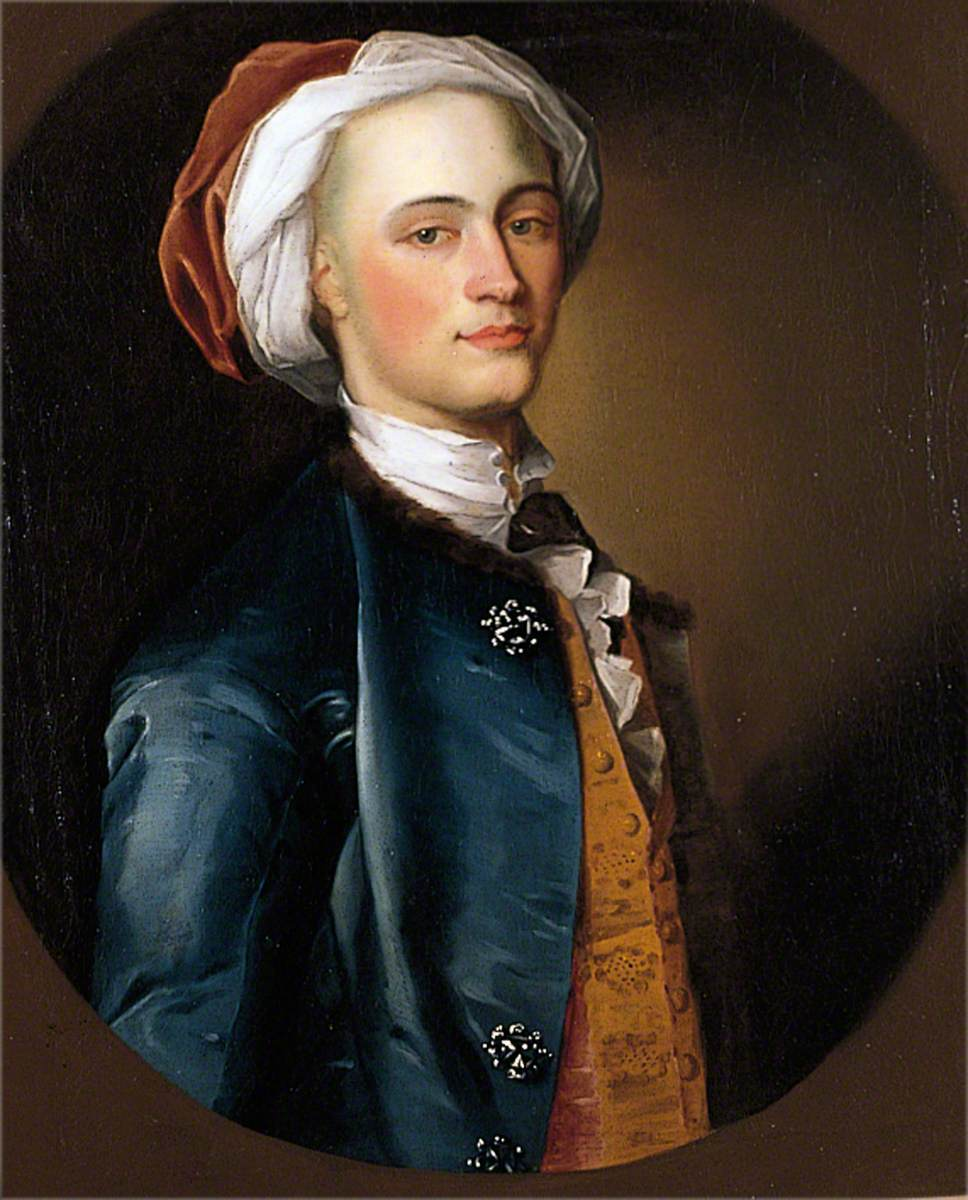
Richard Peckham (1717-1742), painting attributed to Thomas Hudson

Richard Peckham, christened on 14 May 1717 at the church of St Mary in Aldingbourne, entered New College, Oxford in 1734 but died without marrying on 30 August 1742 and was buried at Arundel. His will of 31 May 1740 was proved at Chichester. His portrait was donated to Pallant House Gallery in 1981.
