= Giles Newton =

English asbestos businessman (1891–1974)

Giles Newton MBE
- Born: Giles Fendall Newton; 27 May 1891; England, United Kingdom
- Died: 8 April 1974 (aged 82)
- Occupation: Business executive
- Known for: Executive in the asbestos industry
- Spouse: Mary Cicely (m. 1921; death 1972)
- Children: 2

Giles Fendall Newton, MBE (27 May 1891 – 8 April 1974) was an English asbestos executive and businessman.

== Early life and education ==
Giles Fendall Newton was born on 27 May 1891, the only son of William Latham Newton (1862–1948), of Holtby House, York, and Goldington, Bedford, and his wife, Violet, sixth daughter of Richard Harrison, of Eltofts.

After education at Magdalen College School, Oxford, Newton went up to Lincoln College, Oxford, as an exhibitioner in 1910 to read history. He graduated with a Bachelor of Arts degree in 1914.

== Career ==
He was commissioned into the Queen's Royal West Surrey Regiment in the first year of World War I and eventually served as an adjutant, which saw him appointed a Member of the Order of the British Empire in 1918. In 1917, he was transferred to the Ministry of Munitions.

Newton joined the board of the Cape Asbestos Company Ltd as a director in 1933; between 1957 and 1962, he was its chairman and subsequently became its President.

He served as Deputy Chairman of the London Chamber of Commerce in 1945, and occupied the chair over the following two years. He was also Deputy Chair (1946) and then Chairman (1948) of the London Court of Arbitration. He occupied Staplefield Court in Staplefield, Sussex, and became that county's High Sheriff for 1946–47.

== Personal life ==
In 1921, he married Mary Cicely (died 1972), elder daughter of Brigadier Sir Frederick Meyrick, 2nd Baronet; they had one son, Michael Anthony Fendall Newton, and one daughter, Gillian Prunella Newton. The son, Michael, was a director of the Cape Asbestos Company Ltd. and Managing Director of Cape Building Products, and settled at Broadhurst Wood, Balcombe, Sussex.

He died at his home, 7 Courtenay Gate, Hove, Sussex, on 8 April 1974.
