= Agnes Surriage Frankland =

American tavern maid

Agnes, Lady Surriage Frankland (1726 – April 23, 1783) was an American tavern maid who married Sir Charles Henry ("Harry") Frankland, a British baronet. Her rags-to-riches life story was the basis for several works of literature.

== Biography ==
Born Agnes Surriage to Edward and Mary (Pierce) Surriage in the spring of 1726, the future Lady Frankland grew up in Marblehead, Massachusetts with seven brothers and sisters. Because her family was too large for Edward, a fisherman, to support, Agnes found employment as a young teenager as a waiting girl of all work at the Fountain Inn, a Marblehead tavern. In the summer of 1742, when she was 16 years of age, she caught the eye of Charles Henry ("Harry") Frankland (1716–1768), the 26-year-old Collector of the Port of Boston, in town for business. Frankland was a descendant of Oliver Cromwell and came from one of the richest families in northern England. With her parents' permission, he became her benefactor, accompanied her to Boston, and arranged for her education.

Four years later, in 1746, Agnes became Sir Harry's mistress, a relationship that was said to have shocked Boston society. Sir Harry rose to baronet of Thirsk in the North Riding of Yorkshire on the death of his uncle, Sir Thomas Frankland. Agnes, Sir Harry, and Frankland's son from a previous relationship, Henry Cromwell, then moved to rural Hopkinton, Massachusetts. In 1754, Sir Harry had to return to England, accompanied by Agnes, to contest Sir Thomas Frankland's will, eventually losing the contested property to his uncle's widow.

After this, Agnes, Lady Frankland, and Sir Harry Frankland traveled throughout Europe, eventually marrying. They were staying in Lisbon, Portugal when the Great Lisbon earthquake struck on 1 November 1755. Sir Harry was buried alive in the rubble with his coach and his horses, which had been killed instantly. Agnes set out to search for him, heard his voice, and enlisted the help of men nearby to pull him from the wreckage.

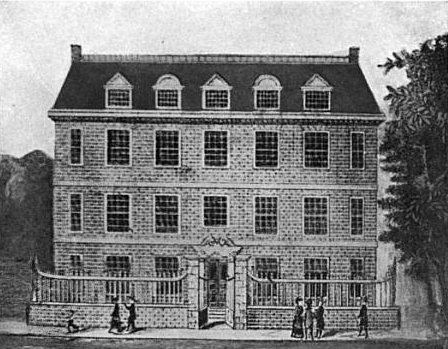
Clark-Frankland house, Garden Court, Boston

The Franklands returned to Boston in 1756 and lived comfortably in the Clark-Frankland Mansion, a 26-room, 3-story house, in Boston's North End. In 1757, they moved back to Lisbon on Sir Harry's appointment as consul general. In 1764, they retired to Bath, England. Sir Harry died in 1768.

Lady Frankland moved back to America to Hopkinton until the outbreak of the American Revolution. She had no children of her own, but returned to England with Sir Harry's son, Henry Cromwell, to live with the Frankland family. She remarried in 1781 to John Drew, a banker in Chichester. She died just two years later in 1783 of pneumonia and was buried in St. Pancras' Church in Chichester.

== Legacy ==
Lady Frankland's life inspired several stories about the tavern maid turned wealthy wife of a baronet, particularly due to her heroics in Lisbon.

Works of literature inspired by Lady Agnes Surriage Frankland:

- Oliver Wendell Holmes' ballad "Agnes" in his Songs in Many Keys (1862)
- Edwin Lassetter Bynner's Agnes Surriage (1886)
- A chapter in Harriet P. Spofford et al., Three Heroines of New England Romance (1894)
- Sir Arthur Quiller-Couch's Lady-Good-for-Nothing: A Man's Portrait of a Woman (1910)
- Marblehead's Pygmalion: Finding the Real Agnes Surriage by F. Marshall Bauer (2010)
