= William Brazier =

English cricketer (1755–1829)

Personal information
- Born: 1755; Cudham, Kent
- Died: 7 October 1829 (aged 73–74); Cudham, Kent
- Batting: Right-handed
- Bowling: Right arm fast (underarm)
- Role: All-rounder

Domestic team information
- Years: Team
- 1774–1794: Kent
- 1776: Surrey

William Brazier (1755 – 7 October 1829) was an English cricketer of the late 18th century. He was an all-rounder who batted right-handed. Using an underarm action, he was a right arm fast bowler. He played mostly for Kent. Brazier also played for Surrey, England, and various ad hoc teams. He was born at Cudham, Kent village 6 miles (9.7 km) north-west of Sevenoaks.

== Cricket career ==
Brazier is first mentioned in sources when he played for Kent against Hampshire at Sevenoaks Vine in 1774. He was then either 18 or 19 years old. He appeared frequently from then until 1776 but, apart from one single wicket match in 1777, he was not recorded again until 1782. Brazier continued to play frequently until 1790. After that, there is only a single appearance in 1794.

Brazier's recorded career spanned the 1774 to 1794 seasons, and he is known to have played in more than sixty matches. The exact number cannot be computed because of missing or incomplete match scorecards. The CricketArchive database, for example, lists 54 but their collection is limited to those matches from which they have a scorecard on the database, and there are more matches without scorecards in which Brazier is known to have played. Using CricketArchive's fifty matches, Brazier scored 1,216 runs in these with a highest score of 79, and took 42 wickets with a best performance of five in one innings. He held 15 catches. (Note: Any match listed in the ACS' Important Match Guide (1981) is historically important, and therefore of the highest standard, whether or not a scorecard might exist. The same applies to numerous matches discovered by researchers since 1981. For further information, see First-class cricket.)

Brazier played as a given man for Surrey in 1776. (Note: A given man was a player who didn't normally play for a particular team, but was recruited (or "given" by the opposition) to even the balance between the teams.) He made several appearances for teams called England. (Note: Teams called England, or England, had been formed since the 1730s. They were by no means international or even national. Cricket in the 18th century was largely confined to the south-eastern counties around London, and England of the time consisted of players from these counties. The teams were in the nature of "Rest of England", and were formed to play against a strong club or county team.)

Although Brazier played for a left-handed team in 1790, Scores and Biographies says he was a right-handed batsman who bowled fast and was a powerful hitter. The same source described him as a farmer at Cudham who continued to play village cricket until 1819. He was a "useful all-rounder" who "hit the ball particularly hard", according to Ashley Mote. James Pycroft, writing in 1851, described him as one of Kent's three best players.

Brazier died at Cudham in 1829.

== Bibliography ==
- ACS (1981). A Guide to Important Cricket Matches Played in the British Isles 1709–1863. Nottingham: ACS. OCLC 85045528.
- ACS (1982). A Guide to FC Cricket Matches Played in the British Isles. Nottingham: ACS. OCLC 10586869.
- Haygarth, Arthur (1996) [1862]. Scores & Biographies, Volume 1 (1744–1826). Kennington: Frederick Lillywhite. ISBN 978-19-00592-23-9.
- Moore, Dudley (1998). The History of Kent County Cricket Club. London: Christopher Helm. ISBN 978-07-47022-09-1.
- Mote, Ashley (1997). The Glory Days of Cricket. London: Robson. ISBN 978-18-61051-11-0.
- Pycroft, Rev. James (1854). The Cricket Field. London: Longman. OCLC 1480847561.
- Waghorn, H. T. (1899). Cricket Scores, Notes, &c. From 1730–1773. Edinburgh: Blackwood. OCLC 1086375331.
