= John Drew (banker) =

English banker and landowner (1734–1808)

High Sheriff of Sussex
- In office 1791–1791
- Preceded by: Henry Manning
- Succeeded by: Edmund Woods

Personal details
- Born: 1734 Chichester, Sussex, England
- Died: 1808 (aged 73–74)
- Spouse(s): Lucy Hart (m. 1763; died 1774) Agnes, Lady Frankland (m. 1781; died 1783) Mary Powlett Drinkwater (m. 1804; died 1808)
- Children: John Drew
- Occupation: Banker

John Drew (12 August 1734 – 1808) was an English banker and landowner, who served as High Sheriff of Sussex.

== Early life ==
Baptised on 12 August 1734 in Chichester, he was the eldest son of John Drew and his first wife Margaret Haskell.

== Career ==
He became a partner in what was known as the Chichester Old Bank, the partners being Griffiths, Chaldecott, Drew & Trew in 1783, Griffiths, Chaldecott & Drew by 1790, Griffiths, Drew & Co by 1796, Griffiths, Drew and Ridge in 1805 and after his death Ridge & Murray. The business has since become part of the Royal Bank of Scotland.

An alderman of the city, he served as mayor in 1785 and again in 1798. On 4 February 1791 he was appointed High Sheriff of Sussex.

As well as his business in Chichester, he invested in lands outside the city. In 1788 he became joint owner of the manor of Keynor in the parish of Sidlesham and he also had extensive lands in the adjoining parish of Earnley.

== Personal life ==
On 15 December 1763, at the church of St Andrew in Chichester, he married Lucy Hart (1739–1774). She died on 9 March 1774 and of their children only one son reached adulthood:

- John Drew (1764–1800), who married Lady Susan (née Murray) Tharp (1768–1826), the daughter of John Murray, 4th Earl of Dunmore, and his wife Lady Charlotte Stewart. Her sister, Lady Augusta Murray, was married to the King's son, Prince Augustus Frederick, Duke of Sussex. Lady Susan was the widow of Joseph Tharp (1767–1797), heir to a huge sugar fortune amassed in Jamaica by his father John Tharp of Chippenham Park, and had two children. After his death, Lady Susan married an Irish clergyman, the Rev. Archibald Edward Douglas, and had a further child.

On 25 October 1781, at the church of All Saints in Chichester, he married Agnes, Lady Frankland (1726–1783), the American widow of Sir Charles Henry Frankland, 4th Baronet. She died on 23 April 1783 and was buried at the church of Church of St Pancras, Chichester.

He made a third marriage on 23 April 1804 at St Luke's Church, Chelsea to a spinster, Mary Powlett Drinkwater (1744–1827), daughter of Woodroffe Drinkwater and his wife Ann Costellow.

Drew died in 1808 and his will was proved in London on 22 June 1808. She survived him, dying on 4 June 1827. In her will of 4 November 1825, proved in London on 16 August 1827, the first beneficiary was Charles Peckham Peckham, grandson of her sister Elizabeth who had married John Peckham of Nyton, and she also left bequests to her husband's two grandchildren.

=== Descendants ===
Through his only surviving son John, he was a grandfather of Lucy Ann Drew, born 1798, and Georgiana Drew, born posthumously in 1801, neither of whom married.
