= Henry Kelsall =

British administrator and politician

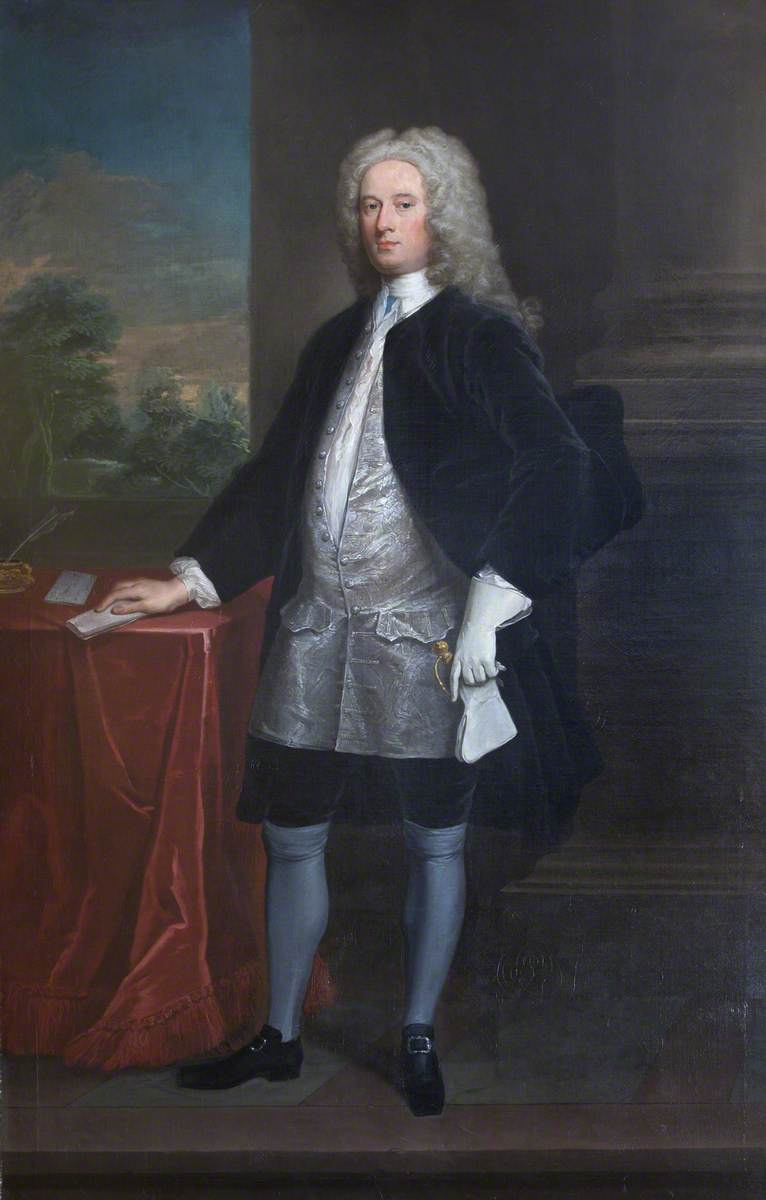

Henry Kelsall (c. 1692–1762), of Colkirk, Norfolk, was a British administrator and politician who sat in the House of Commons from 1719 to 1734.

Kelsall was the son of Henry Kelsall of Chester. He was educated at Westminster School under Knipe, where he was a school-fellow of Thomas Holles, the future Duke of Newcastle. He was admitted at Trinity College, Cambridge on 7 February 1708, aged 15 and became a fellow in 1714.

Kelsall was appointed Senior clerk at the Treasury under William Lowndes in November 1714. This was presumably through the influence of Newcastle, and he retained the post for the rest of his life. Newcastle was probably also instrumental in his return as Member of Parliament for Chichester at a by-election on 3 December 1719. At the 1722 general election, the Government brought him in as MP for Bossiney. After Lowndes death in 1724, he was second in command at the Treasury to John Scrope. He served on the House of Commons committees that were responsible for drawing up the finance bills each session. At the 1727 general election, he was returned as MP for Mitchell. He did not stand in 1734 but was appointed a commissioner of land taxes in 1735. He still retained his Treasury post. On 27 May 1736, he became a Fellow of the Royal Society. In June 1761 he tried to sell his position as commissioner of taxes but Newcastle refused to allow it.

Kelsall applied to Newcastle for a small pension for his daughter on 1 February 1762, shortly before his death and it was subsequently granted. He died on 10 February 1762.

Parliament of Great Britain
Preceded by Sir Richard Farington, 1st Bt; Thomas Miller	Member of Parliament for Chichester; 1719–1722; With: Thomas Miller	Succeeded by Charles Lennox; Thomas Miller
Preceded by Henry Cartwright; Samuel Molyneux	Member of Parliament for Bossiney; 1722–1727; With: Robert Corker	Succeeded by Robert Corker; John Hedges
Preceded by Charles Selwyn; John Hedges	Member of Parliament for Mitchell; 1727–1734; With: Thomas Farrington	Succeeded by Thomas Watts; Robert Ord
