= Sir Thomas Miller, 5th Baronet =

Sir Thomas Miller, 5th Baronet (1731 – 4 September 1816), was an English politician who sat in the House of Commons in two periods between 1774 and 1816.

== Early life ==
Miller was the eldest son of Sir John Miller, 4th Baronet of Lavant near Chichester, and his wife Susan Combe, daughter of Matthew Combe MD of Winchester, and was baptised on 5 May 1731. He entered Corpus Christi College, Cambridge in 1753. He married firstly Hannah Black, daughter of John Black, alderman of Norwich on 1 June 1762. In 1770, he bought a country house in Hampshire called Froyle Place with the manor of Froyle. He succeeded his father in the baronetcy on 19 April 1772.

== Political career ==
Miller stood unsuccessfully for parliament at Lewes at the 1768 general election, but was returned as Member of Parliament for Lewes at the top of the poll in 1774. He did not stand again in 1780.

Miller was out of Parliament for the next 26 years, but maintained his political interest by joining the Whig Club on 4 April 1785 and Brooks on 20 May 1791. Sometime around 1780 he made a second marriage to Elizabeth Edwards. He moved from Sussex to Hampshire in this time.

At the age of 75 Miller was returned unopposed as MP for Portsmouth on the interest of Sir John Carter at the 1806 general election. He was returned again in 1807 and 1812.

== Later life and legacy ==
Miller died on 21 May 1812. He had two daughters from his first marriage and two sons and three daughters from his second marriage. He was succeeded in the baronetcy by his son Thomas.

Parliament of Great Britain
Preceded by Thomas Hampden and Thomas Hay	Member of Parliament for Lewes; 1774–1780; With: Thomas Hay	Succeeded by Henry Pelham and Thomas Kemp
Parliament of the United Kingdom
Preceded by David Montagu Erskine; John Markham	Member of Parliament for Portsmouth; 1806–1816; With: John Markham	Succeeded by John Bonham Carter; John Markham
Baronetage of the United Kingdom
Preceded by John Miller	Baronet (of Chichester); 1772–1816	Succeeded by Thomas Combe Miller
