= Hurst Green, East Sussex =

Village in East Sussex, England

Coordinates: 51.02°N 0.47°E

Hurst Green
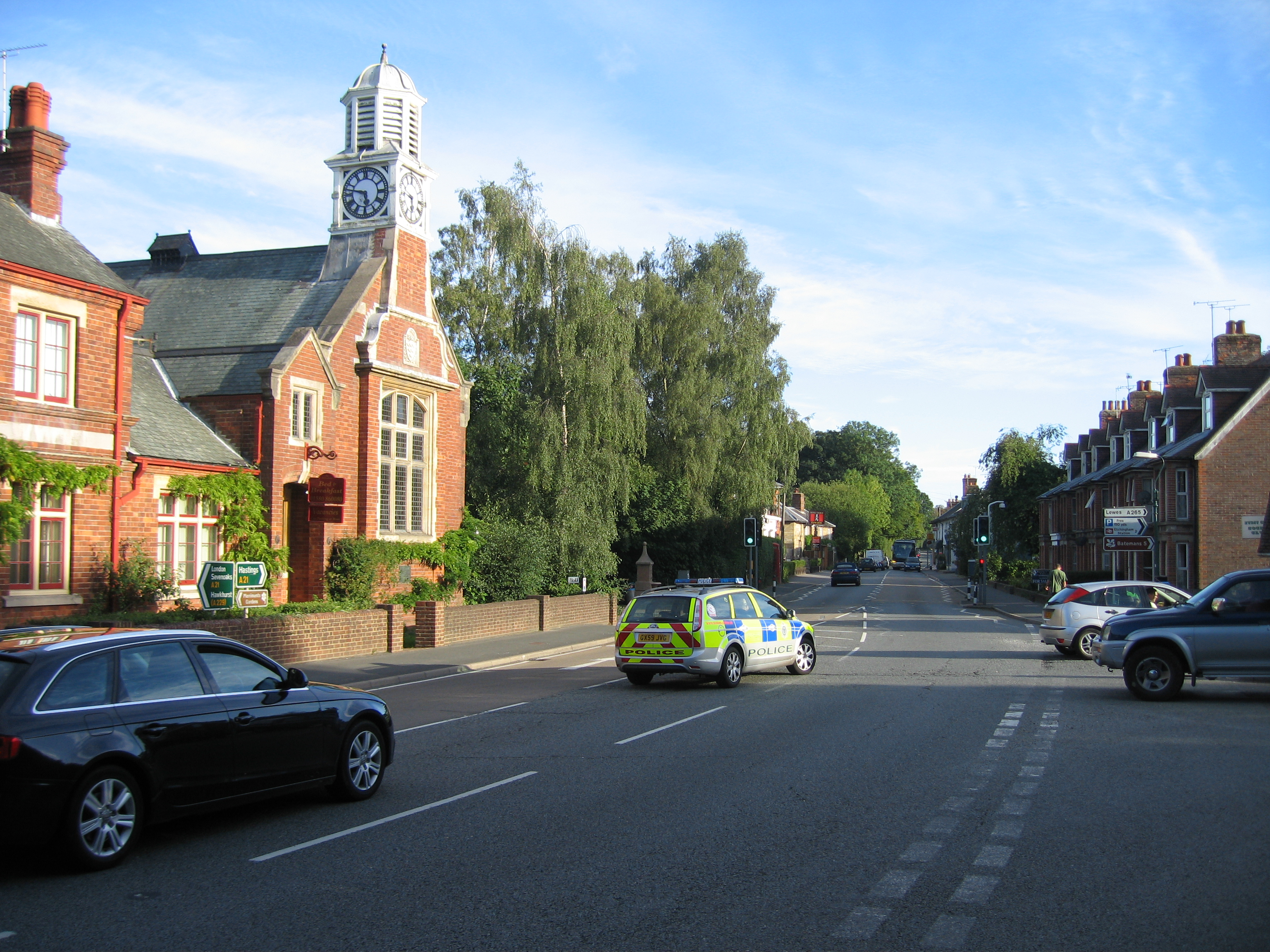
- View along the A21 towards Hastings with the old courthouse on the left

- Location within East Sussex
- Area: 10.4 km^{2} (4.0 sq mi)
- Population: 1,481 (Parish-2011)
  - Density: 362/sq mi (140/km^{2})
- OS grid reference: TQ733271
  - London: 42 miles (68 km) NW
- Civil parish: Hurst Green
- District: Rother
- Shire county: East Sussex
- Region: South East
- Country: England
- Sovereign state: United Kingdom
- Post town: ETCHINGHAM
- Postcode district: TN19
- Dialling code: 01580
- Police: Sussex
- Fire: East Sussex
- Ambulance: South East Coast
- UK Parliament: Bexhill and Battle
- Website: https://www.hurstgreen-pc.gov.uk

Hurst Green is a village and civil parish in the Rother district of East Sussex, England, and is located south of the East Sussex / Kent border at Flimwell.

The area is entirely contained within the High Weald Area of Outstanding Natural Beauty.

The village is located on the A21 road, halfway between Tunbridge Wells, Kent, in the north and Hastings in the south, approx 13 miles (20 km) each way. The A265 road starts in the village at the A21, previously starting in Hawkhurst.

There is one active church in the village: the brick-built Church of England parish church, dedicated to the Holy Trinity. The Roman Catholic church of Our Lady Help of Christians is now disused and has now been converted into a community shop, which also contains the village post office. The local primary school is Hurst Green CE Primary School.

The settlements of Silver Hill and Swiftsden are also located within the parish.

There is an active parish council.

== History ==
Before the Norman conquest, Hurst Green was part of the parish of Salehurst which belonged to Countess Goda, however it is likely that few people lived in the area.

There is a ridgeway track that runs through Hurst Green via Etchingham to Heathfield, and which was likely to have been in use during the Iron Age.

In 1744 the village green covered a triangular area from the courthouse to the village hall, including land on which some houses in Station Road now stand. "The Cottage" (MES3972) and "Yew Tree" (DES4516) are shown on a map dated 1650, and so must have stood on the edge of the village green.

In the 1870s Hurst Green was described as a "hamlet in Salehurst parish, Sussex; 1½ mile ENE of Etchingham station, and 7 N of Battle. It has a head post office and Iridge Place is adjacent".

The Church of England primary school was originally built in 1862 with an adjacent residence for the master.

The tower and the clock were erected by public subscription in memory of George Burrow Gregory of Boarzell who died 5 March 1892.

In 1952 the civil parish of Hurst Green was created from portions of the parishes of Etchingham, Salehurst and Ticehurst and the ecclesiastical parish was formed in 1907.

By the 1930s, the population of Hurst Green was 628 (counts in 1934 and 1938).

== Local legend ==
- It is possible that the area known locally as Burgh Hill on the south side of the village was the site of a fort built by King Alfred the Great, this is mentioned in the Burghal Hidage (a record of the forts from Alfred's reign) as being called Eorpeburner.
- There are reports of possible tunnels under and around the village that were used by the infamous Hawkhurst Gang that ran between the village and Hawkhurst to enable their smuggling operations. However, none have ever been found.

== Village organisations ==
Hurst Green has several clubs and organisations, many of these use the village hall to meet and details of upcoming meetings are posted on the noticeboard within the hall foyer.

- The Hurst Green Short mat bowls Club gives villagers, both young and more mature, the opportunity to play short mat bowls for fun, and competitively.

== Twin towns ==
- Ellerhoop, Germany

== Notable buildings ==
Hurst Green and surrounding areas are home to several notable buildings and areas, including:

- Iridge Place
- Barnhurst
- Drewett Cricket Field
- Etchingham Lodge
- Haremere Hall, a Grade I listed Jacobean building
- Hurst Green Courthouse

Despite its small size, Hurst Green has a considerable number of Grade II listed buildings, including:

- Antiques, the Pigeon House
- April Cottage Cordwainers
- London Road, Nos 15-25, 28, 30, 43, 45, 76, 87, 89, 91, 93, 115, 117, 119, 121, 123
- Barnhurst
- Bellhurst Oast Cooper's Farm Oast
- Burghwood Cottage Iden Cottage
- Cooper's Corner Farmhouse
- Drinking fountain in front of Lancefield House
- Firs Cottage
- Grove Cottage
- Grove Hill Farmhouse
- Haremere Hall Stables
- Hawthorne Cottage
- Hurst Green Stores and Post Office
- Kim Cottage Two Hoots
- Lancefield House
- Little Barnhurst
- Sandstones, the former stables of the Royal George
- Silver Hill Farmhouse
- Stangate
- Station Road, No. 4
- Old Bull Inn
- Royal George public house
- Stables of Iridge Place
- White Horse public house
- Woolpack Inn
- Yew Tree House

== Photographs ==
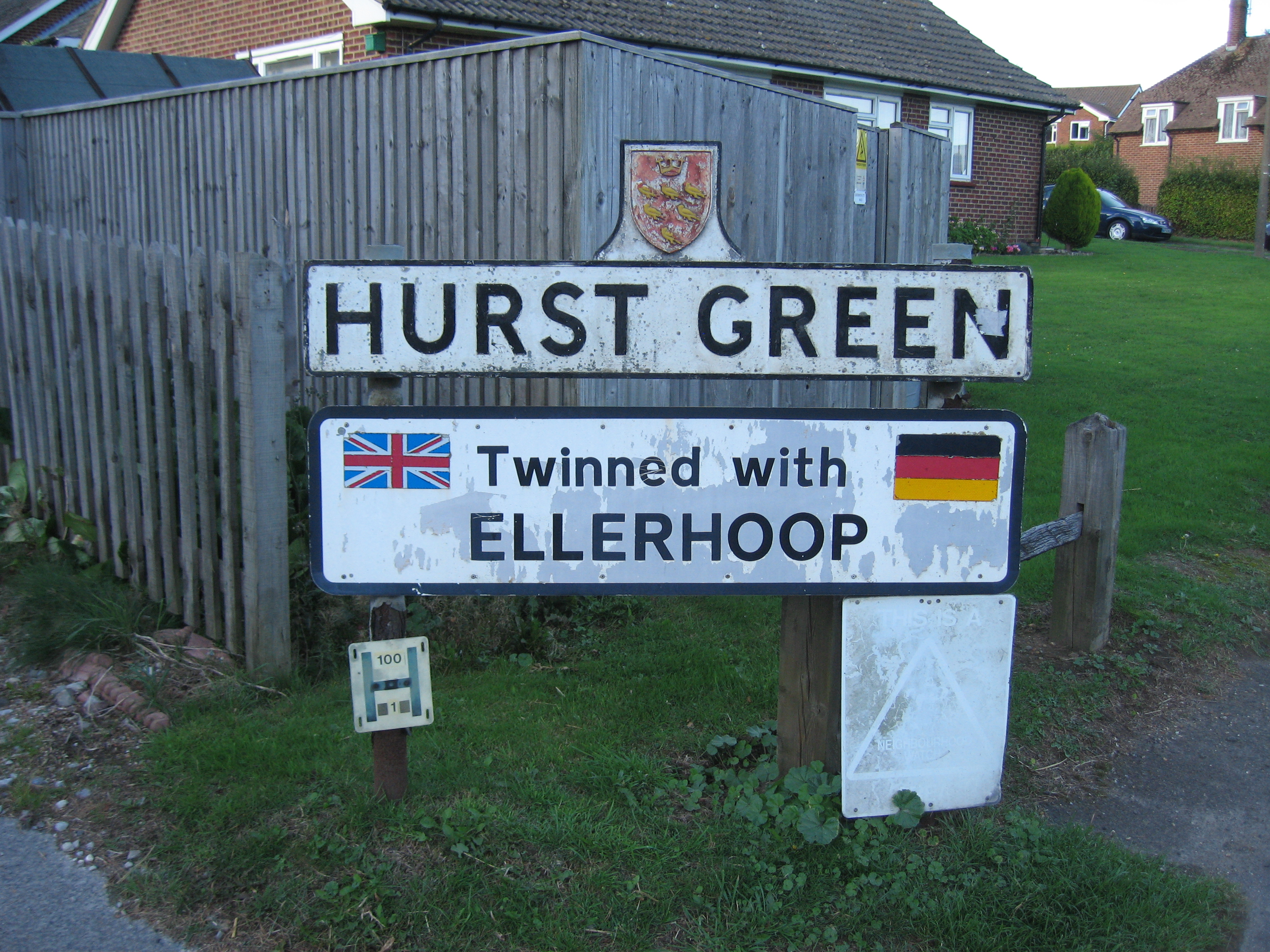
Village sign

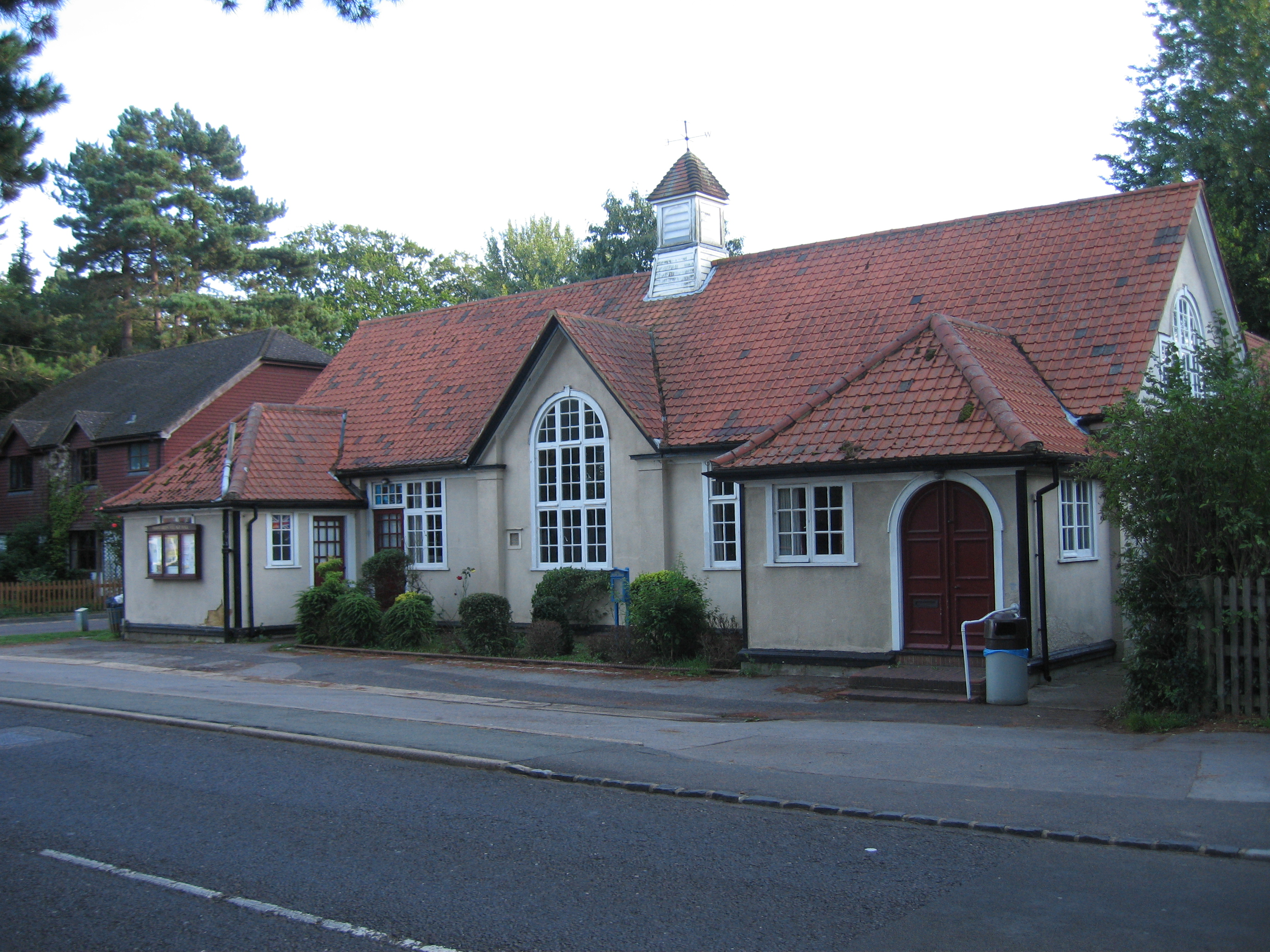
Village hall

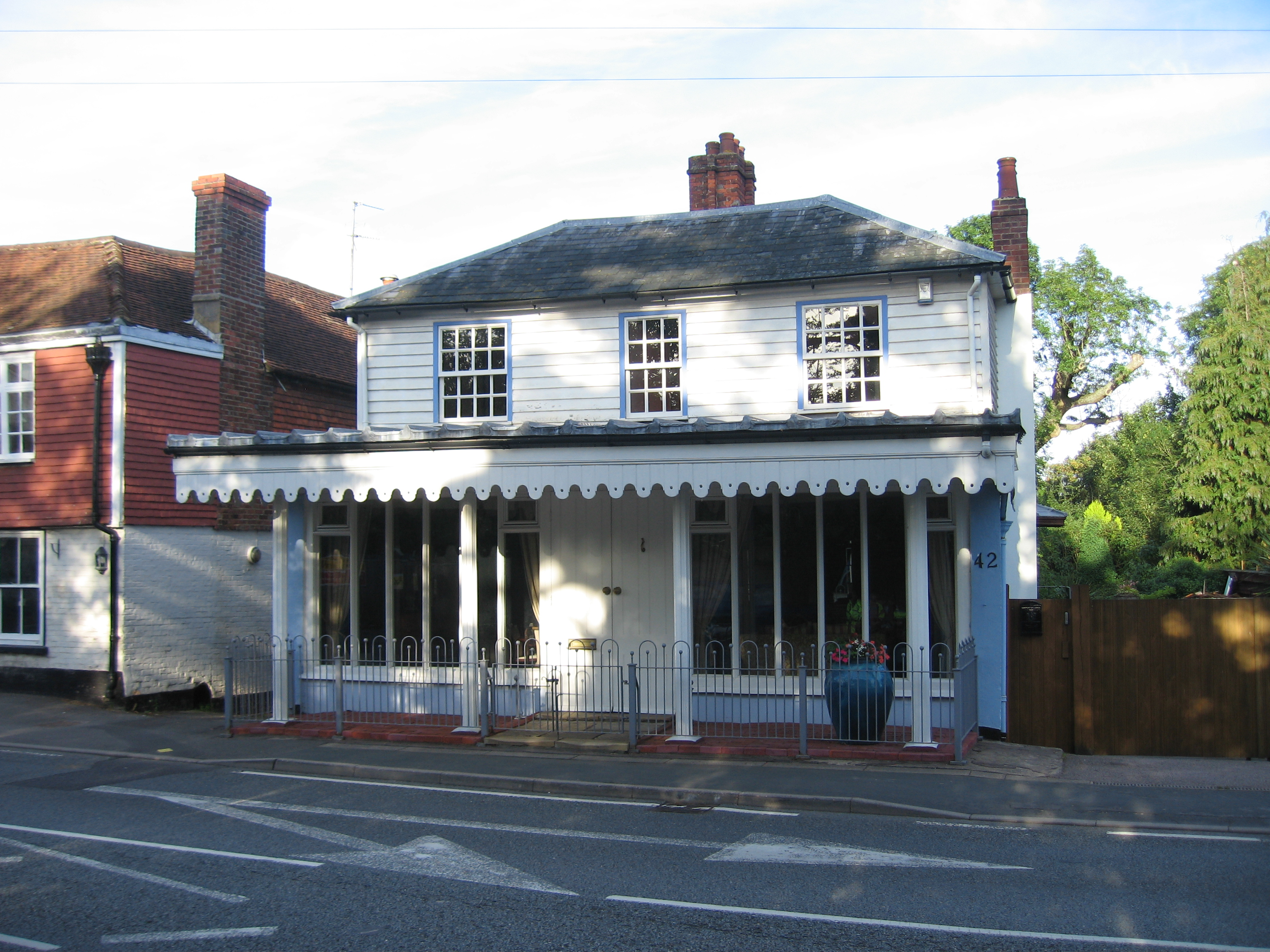
Old Hurst Green Post Office on the A21

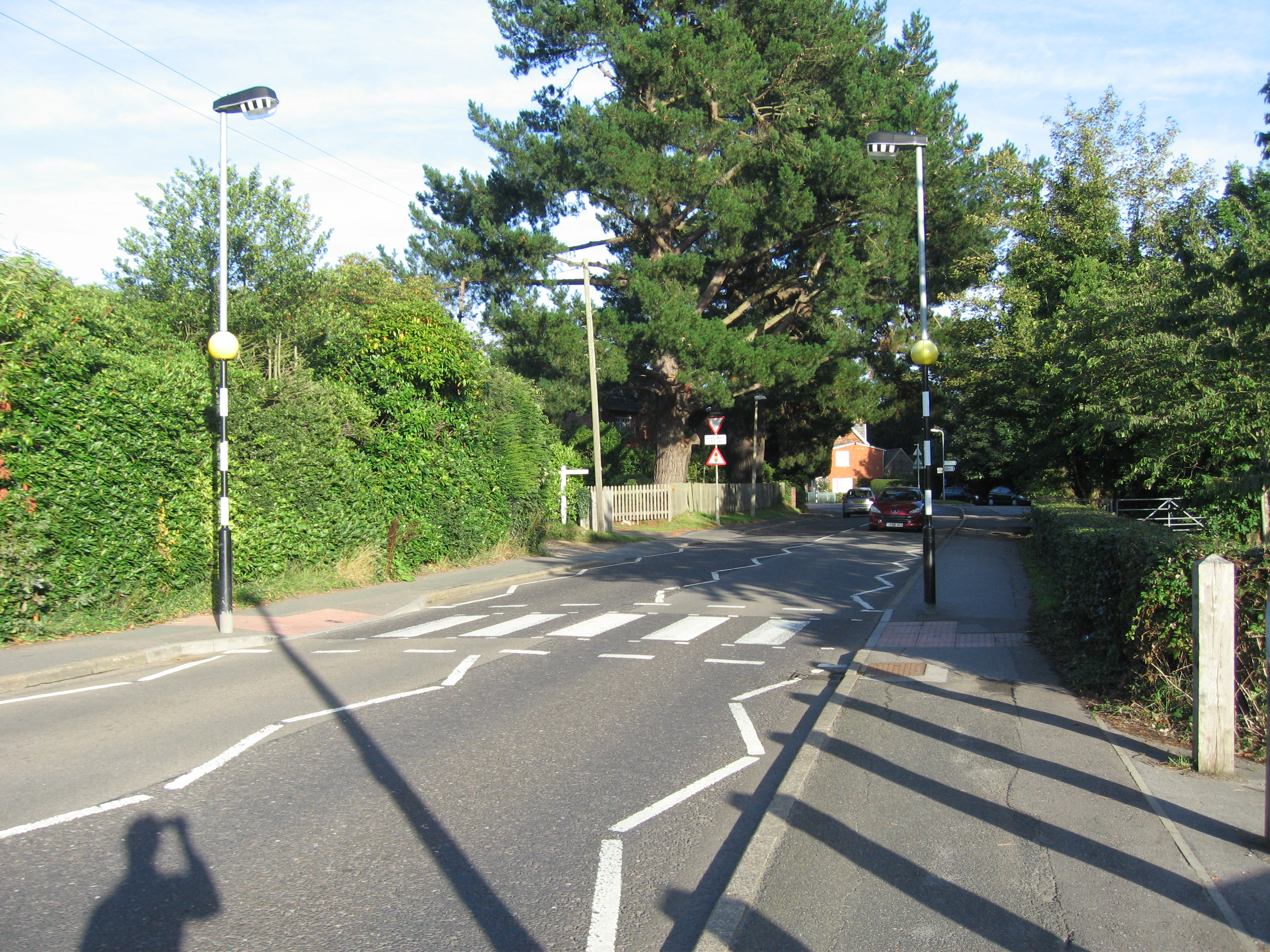
Station Road (A265)
