= Miller baronets of Manderston (1874) =

Escutcheon of the Miller baronets of Manderston

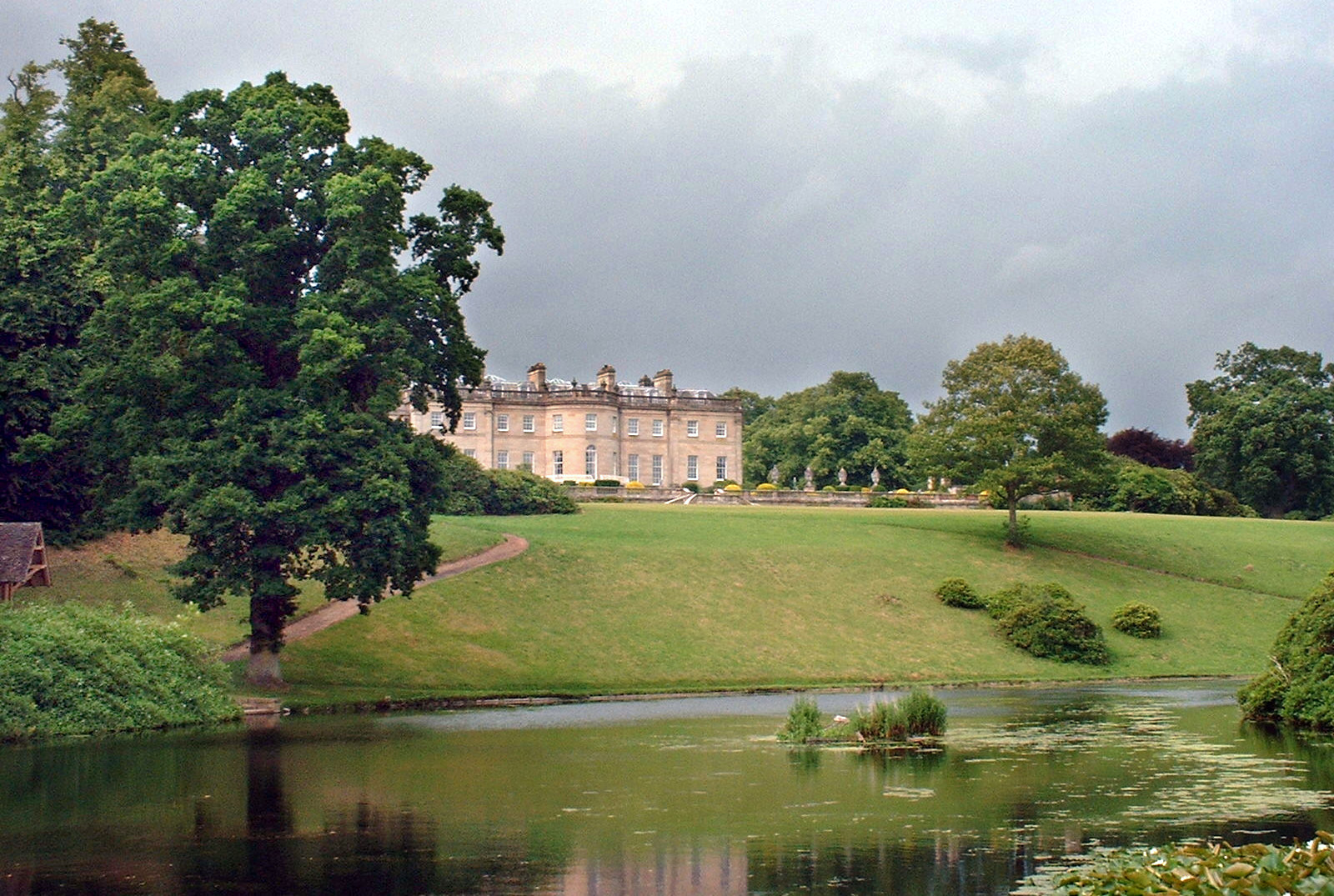
Manderston, seat of the Miller baronets

The Miller baronetcy, of Manderston in the County of Berwick, was created in the Baronetage of the United Kingdom on 24 March 1874 for the diplomat and politician William Miller. The title became extinct on the death of his younger son, the 3rd Baronet, in 1918.

== Miller baronets, of Manderston (1874) ==
- Sir William Miller, 1st Baronet (1809–1887)
- Sir James Miller, 2nd Baronet (1864–1906)
- Sir John Miller, 3rd Baronet (1867–1918)
