= Froyle =

Village and parish in Hampshire, England

Coordinates: 51.18583°N 0.91510°W

Upper & Lower Froyle
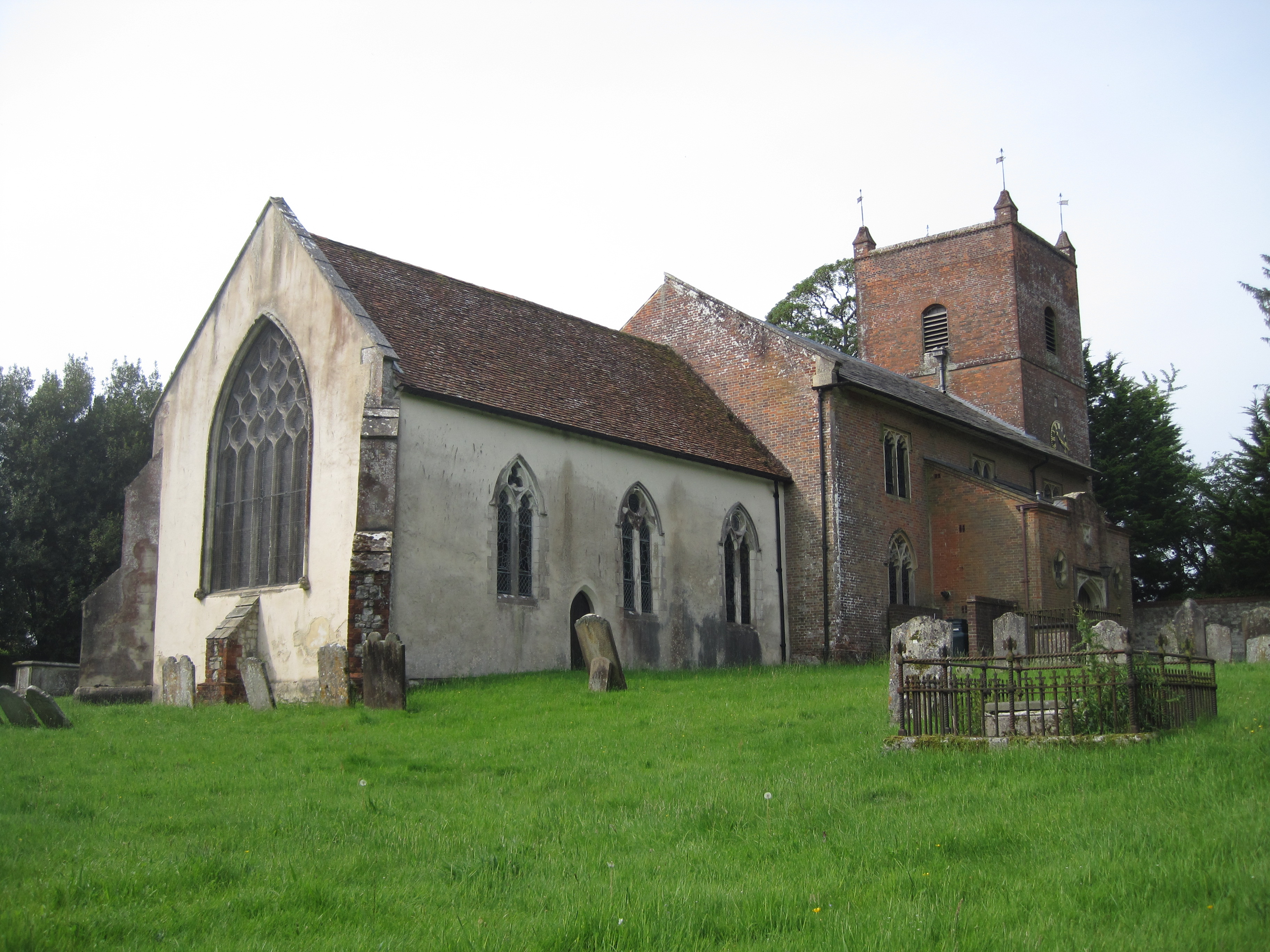
- St Mary's Church, Upper Froyle

- Location within Hampshire
- OS grid reference: SU759435
- Civil parish: Froyle
- District: East Hampshire
- Shire county: Hampshire
- Region: South East
- Country: England
- Sovereign state: United Kingdom
- Post town: Alton
- Postcode district: GU34
- Police: Hampshire and Isle of Wight
- Fire: Hampshire and Isle of Wight
- Ambulance: South Central
- UK Parliament: East Hampshire

Froyle is a village and civil parish in the East Hampshire district of Hampshire, England. It is 3.6 miles (5.8 km) northeast of Alton. The nearest railway station is 2 miles (3.3 km) east of the village, at Bentley. According to the 2011 census, the parish had a population of 644 people. The village is divided into Upper Froyle, centred around the Church and Manor House, and Lower Froyle which grew up around the farms.

== History ==
Froyle is situated on the edge of The Downs above the Pilgrims' Way that leads from Winchester to Canterbury. It is most likely that, in the winter months, the actual route taken by Pilgrims passed through the village to avoid the wet conditions in the valley of the River Wey. There was a Church at "Froli" (mentioned in the Domesday Book) in 1086. The entry for Froyle also states "Froyle, it was ever there...." and there are traces of habitation on the surrounding downs going back to the Iron Age.

It is also known by some who live there as the 'village of the saints' because of the 19 statues of saints in niches on the front walls of houses and other buildings in Upper Froyle. They were bought by Sir Hubert Miller in the early 20th century from Italy.

== Notable people ==
- Sir John Jephson, MP and Irish Privy councillor (died 1638), Lord of the Manor of Froyle, and his son William Jephson (died 1658), politician and confidant of Oliver Cromwell.
- Rev. Sir Thomas Miller, 6th Baronet: he was both the vicar and the lord of the manor of Froyle.
- Sir Henry John Miller (1830-1918), emigrated to New Zealand and became Speaker of the New Zealand Legislative Council.
