= William Peckham (landowner) =

English sheriff (1689–1765)

William Peckham (1689–1765) was an English landowner who served as Sheriff of Sussex in 1718.

Baptised at Salehurst on 18 February 1689, he was the only son of William Peckham (1644–1715) and his wife Martha Pooke. Succeeding his father in 1715, he was married on 1 September 1716 to Mary Newnham (1690–1765) and selected as sheriff of the county in 1718. He lived at Iridge in Salehurst and was buried in the village church in 1765, his estate being probated on 16 March 1765. Though he and his wife had eight children, the only one to marry was Elizabeth Peckham (1729–1806), wife of John Micklethwait.
