= Dunlop baronets of Dunlop (1838) =

Escutcheon of the Dunlop baronets of Dunlop

The Dunlop baronetcy, of Dunlop in the County of Ayr, was created in the Baronetage of the United Kingdom in 1838 for John Dunlop, Member of Parliament for Ayrshire from 1835 to 1839. The title became extinct on the death of the 2nd Baronet in 1858.

== Dunlop baronets, of Dunlop (1838) ==
- Sir John Dunlop, 1st Baronet (1806–1839)
- Sir James Dunlop, 2nd Baronet (1830–1858)

== Notes ==
Baronetage of the United Kingdom
Preceded by Micklethwait baronets	Dunlop baronets of Dunlop; July 1838	Succeeded by Shakerley baronets
