= Henry Peckham (MP for Chichester) =

English politician (1615–1673)

Sir Henry Peckham (1614–1673) was an English landowner, lawyer, judge, administrator, and politician who sat in the House of Commons as MP for Chichester in Sussex at various times between 1654 and 1673.

== Family and education ==
Baptised on 26 August 1614 in the church of St Mary at Aldingbourne near Chichester, he was the first child of William Peckham (1596-1671), a landowner in that village, and his first wife Mary Raseld (died 1628). In 1632 he was admitted to university at Magdalen Hall, Oxford, followed by legal training at the Middle Temple in 1634, and was called to the bar in 1641.

On 8 May 1644, in the church of St Mary at Washington, he married Judith Goring (1623-1678), daughter of Henry Goring who lived at Highden in that parish, and his wife Mary Eversfield, daughter of Sir Thomas Eversfield, a Sheriff of Sussex. Her brother was Sir Henry Goring, 2nd Baronet. They had ten children, including the second son Henry Peckham (born 1648), who was mayor of Chichester in 1681 and 1686, and the third son John Peckham (died 1700), father of the childless Henry « Lisbon » Peckham (1683-1764), a wine merchant who built Pallant House in Chichester.

The later Sheriff of Sussex, Sir Thomas Peckham (1691-1724), was his first cousin twice removed.

== Career ==
He was a JP for Sussex from 1647 to 1649 and from 1654 was Recorder of Chichester. In that year he was elected as Member of Parliament for Chichester in the First Protectorate Parliament. He became a JP for Sussex again in 1655 and held the position until his death. In 1656 he was re-elected MP for Chichester in the Second Protectorate Parliament and in 1657 became a commissioner for assessment for Sussex. From 1657 until his death, in addition to his position at Chichester, he was Recorder of Portsmouth. In 1659, he was re-elected MP for Chichester in the Third Protectorate Parliament and became a commissioner for assessment for Sussex from January 1660 until his death. In March 1660 he was appointed a commissioner for militia for Sussex and in April 1660 was re-elected MP for Chichester in the Convention Parliament. Further posts were as commissioner for oyer and terminer on the Home circuit in July 1660 and commissioner for sewers in West Sussex in October 1660.

In 1661 he won his fifth election as MP for Chichester in the Cavalier Parliament, acquiring the additional post of Recorder of Newport on the Isle of Wight after 1661 and being knighted on 24 May 1662. He became a bencher of his Inn in 1663 and was commissioner for assessment for Chichester from 1663 to 1664. In 1669 he was promoted to serjeant-at-law and served as Reader of his Inn.

He inherited his father's lands in 1671 but died at the age of 57 and was buried at the church of St Peter the Great in Chichester on 27 April 1673.

Parliament of England
Preceded by Not represented in Barebones Parliament	Member of Parliament for Chichester; 1654–1659; With: William Cawley 1659	Succeeded by Not represented in Restored Rump
Preceded by Not represented in Restored Rump	Member of Parliament for Chichester; 1660–1673; With: William Cawley; John Farrington	Succeeded by William Garway; John Farrington
