= Miller baronets of Oxenhoath (1660) =

Escutcheon of the Miller baronets of Oxenhoath

The Miller baronetcy, of Oxenhoath in the County of Kent, was created in the Baronetage of England on 13 October 1660 for Humphrey Miller. He was the son of Sir Nicholas Miller, knighted by Charles I, and his wife Anne Style, sister of William Style. He was High Sheriff of Kent in 1666.

The 2nd Baronet was the son of the 1st Baronet by his first marriage, to Mary, sister of Sir John Borlase, 2nd Baronet. The title became extinct on his death in 1714.

== Miller baronets, of Oxenhoath (1660) ==
- Sir Humphrey Miller, 1st Baronet (died 1709)
- Sir Borlase Miller, 2nd Baronet (died 1714)
