= Henry Miller (New Zealand politician) =

New Zealand politician

The Honourable Sir Henry Miller
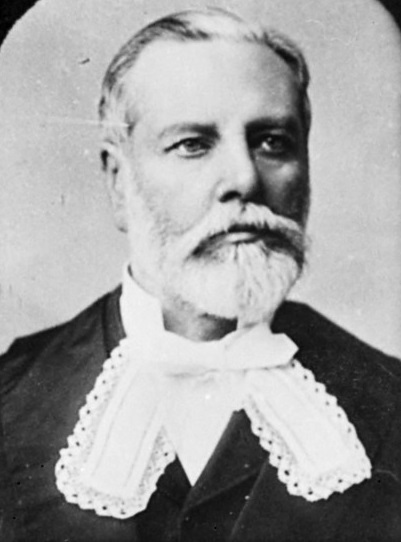

8th Speaker of the Legislative Council
- In office 8 July 1892 – 6 October 1903
- Preceded by: Harry Atkinson
- Succeeded by: William Campbell Walker

Personal details
- Born: 9 September 1830
- Died: 6 February 1918 (aged 87)
- Party: Independent

Sir Henry John Miller (9 September 1830 – 6 February 1918) was a New Zealand politician.

== Biography ==
Miller was the second son of The Rev. Sir Thomas Combe Miller, 6th Baronet (see Miller baronets) and his wife Martha Holmes, daughter of the Rev. Thomas Holmes, of Bungay, Suffolk. He was educated at Eton College and admitted to Trinity College, Cambridge on 8 July 1848. He rowed in the Cambridge eight in the second Boat Race of 1849 in December when Cambridge lost.

Miller went to New Zealand where he took up sheep farming and was involved in other commercial activities at Otago. He was a member of the provincial government of Otago from 1863 to 1864, a member of the New Zealand Legislative Council from 1865 to 1917, when he resigned. He was the Speaker of the Legislative Council from 1892 to 1903. He was knighted in 1901.

Miller married Jessie Orbell, daughter of John Orbell, of Hawkesbury, Otago on 15 December 1864. They had five sons and two daughters.

== See also ==
- List of Cambridge University Boat Race crews

== Notes ==
Political offices
Preceded by Harry Atkinson	Speaker of the New Zealand Legislative Council; 1892–1903	Succeeded by William Campbell Walker
