= William Cawley (younger) =

17th-century English lawyer and politician

William Cawley (born April 7, 1629) was an English lawyer and politician who sat in the House of Commons in 1659 and 1660.

Cawley was the eldest son of William Cawley the regicide, and his first wife Catherine Walrond, daughter of William Walrond of Isle Brewers, Somerset. He entered Inner Temple on November 10, 1645 at age 16, and was called to the bar in 1652. He was J.P. for Sussex from 1652 to July 1660 and was commissioner for assessment in 1652. In 1657 he was commissioner for assessment again. He was commissioner for militia in 1659. Also in 1659, Cawley was elected Member of Parliament for Chichester in the Third Protectorate Parliament. He was commissioner for assessment in January 1660. In April 1660 he was elected MP for Chichester in the Convention Parliament in a double return, but his election was declared void on 21 May. Cawley succeeded his father who had died in exile in 1667.

At the time of the Restoration the Cawley property including his personal property was confiscated.

In 1680 William Cawley published a book The Laws of Queen Elizabeth, King James and King Charles the First but by 1700 he was reduced to poverty and dependent on a grant of £5 from the Inner Temple. He died in penury in 1700.

Cawley married Elizabeth Johnson, daughter of sequestrated Cavalier Thomas Johnson in 1655.

Parliament of England
Preceded by Henry Peckham	Member of Parliament for Chichester; 1659; With: Henry Peckham	Succeeded by Not represented in Restored Rump
