= 79th Regiment of Foot (1757) =

British military unit 1757–1763

The 79th Regiment of Foot was a British military unit, formed in 1757 at the beginning of the Seven Years' War. Its commander was Brigadier General William Draper.

It moved to India in 1758 and saw service in the third Carnatic War. In 1762 the regiment took part in the successful invasion of Manila, capital of the Spanish-controlled Philippines. The regiment was disbanded at Chatham in 1763.

A monument to the "departed warriors" of the 79th, a cenotaph in the form of a classical sarcophagus topped by an urn, stands on Clifton Down in Bristol. It was originally erected in the garden of General Draper's house Manilla Hall in 1797, and is reputed to be the oldest war memorial in Britain. Its similarity to designs in the copybook of Thomas Paty suggests he or a member of his family may have been the designer; a second monument from Draper's garden, an obelisk dedicated to William Pitt the Elder, also attributed to Paty, stands nearby. They were moved to their current site in 1883 when Manilla Hall and its grounds were redeveloped.
