= John Frame (cricketer) =

English cricketer (1733–1796)

Personal information
- Full name: John Frame
- Born: 1733; Warlingham, Surrey
- Died: 11 October 1796 (aged 62–63); Dartford, Kent
- Bowling: Underarm fast
- Role: Fast bowler

Domestic team information
- Years: Team
- 1749–1750: Surrey
- 1751–1774: Dartford Cricket Club
- 1751–1774: Kent
- 1751–1774: England

John Frame (1733 – 11 October 1796) was an English cricketer of the mid-Georgian period who played for Dartford, Kent and Surrey. He also represented various England teams. He was born in Warlingham, Surrey, and died in Dartford, Kent. His known career spanned the 1749 to 1774 English cricket seasons from the ages of 16 to 41.

Frame was an outstanding fast bowler who was favourably compared with Lumpy Stevens. Like all bowlers of his time, he used an underarm action. In the first half of his career until about 1760, bowlers delivered the ball all along the ground. Cricket then underwent an evolutionary change as pitching was introduced, still with an underarm action; the modern straight bat was invented in response.

== Cricket career ==
Frame was only 16 when he played for Surrey v England at Dartford Brent on 2–3 June 1749. Surrey won by 2 wickets. In 1750, he played for Surrey in three matches against Kent and his brother (first name unknown) was in the same team in each match. Frame played for Surrey as he still lived in Warlingham at this time. He may have moved to Dartford soon afterwards as he was playing for Kent in 1751, and he became chiefly associated with Dartford Cricket Club. He is first recorded as an England player in May 1751, playing against Kent.

Frame's last known appearance was for England v Hampshire at Sevenoaks Vine on 8–9 July 1774. Hampshire, who had Lumpy Stevens as a given man, won by 169 runs. Frame was described by John Nyren as one of the Hambledon Club's greatest opponents and as "the other principal (bowler) with Lumpy". Nyren says he remembers little of Frame, except that he was a fast bowler and an unusually stout man for a cricketer.

Writing in 1900, F. S. Ashley-Cooper said in his introduction to At the Sign of the Wicket that the best 18th century players "possessed that amount of genius which would make them excellent players in any age". He named Frame, David Harris, Richard Newland, and John Small as examples.

== Bibliography ==
- Haygarth, Arthur (1996) [1862]. Scores & Biographies, Volume 1 (1744–1826). Kennington: Frederick Lillywhite. ISBN 978-19-00592-23-9.
- Nyren, John (1998) [1832]. Mote, Ashley (ed.). The Cricketers of my Time. London: Robson Publishing. ISBN 978-18-61051-68-4.
