= Thomas Carr (MP) =

British politician (1658–1721)

Thomas Carr (baptised 14 July 1658 – buried 23 June 1721) was an English politician who was Mayor of Chichester (1708–9) and Member of Parliament for Chichester (1708–1710).
