= John Braman =

English politician

John Braman (1627–1703), of Chichester, Sussex, was an English politician.

He was a member (MP) of the parliament of England for Chichester in March 1679, October 1679 and 1681.
