= Samuel Colchin =

English cricketer

Samuel Colchin (fl. 1747 – 1779) was an English cricketer who played in the 1770s.

A nephew of Robert Colchin, a noted single wicket cricketer of the first half of the 18th century, he played in a total of 10 important matches, four of which were for Kent, all as a given man (Note: A given man was a player who would not usually play for a team and was generally not qualified by either birth or residence to do so. They were either recruited to play for it or "given" by the opposition, to produce a more balanced contest and, in some cases, to attract a bigger crowd.) against Hampshire. He played five matches for England (i.e., the "rest" of England), and one top-level appearance for Hampshire.

Colchin was christened at Bromley in Kent in June 1747. He is last mentioned in June 1779 playing in a five-a-side single wicket match at the Artillery Ground for John Sackville, 3rd Duke of Dorset's team against Sir Horatio Mann's team.

== Bibliography ==
- Carlaw, Derek (2020). Kent County Cricketers, A to Z: Part One (1806–1914) (PDF). Cardiff: ACS.
- Lewis, Paul (2014). For Kent and Country. Eastbourne: Reveille Press. ISBN 978-19-08336-63-7.
