= Miller baronets =

Set index for Shelley baronets

There have been four baronetcies created for persons with the surname Miller, two in the Baronetage of England, one in the Baronetage of Great Britain and one in the Baronetage of the United Kingdom. Two of the creations are extant as of 2026.

- Miller baronets of Oxenhoath (1660)
- Miller baronets of Chichester (1705)
- Miller baronets of Glenlee (1788)
- Miller baronets of Manderston (1874)
