= William Elson (died 1727) =

English politician

William Elson (1691–1727), of Oving, near Chichester, Sussex, was an English politician.

He was born the son of William Elson of Oving and was educated at New College, Oxford. He succeeded his father in 1705 when only a child.

He was a member (MP) of the parliament of Great Britain for Chichester 1713 to 1715.

He died at only 36 years of age. He had married Anne, the daughter of Sir John Suffield of Portsmouth, Hampshire and left his property in trust for their only daughter.
