= Iridge Place =

Historic English country house

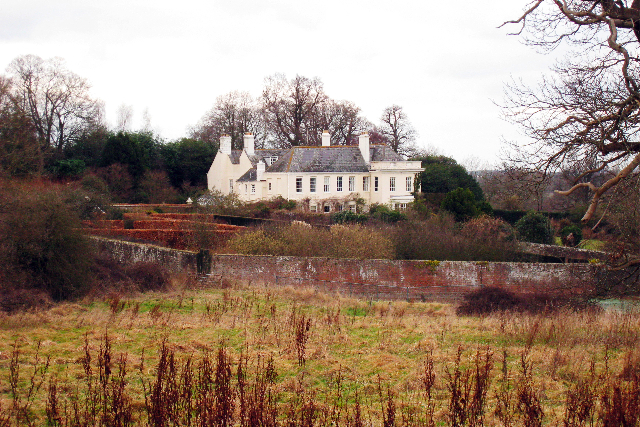
Iridge Place

Iridge Place is a Grade II* listed country house in Hurst Green, East Sussex, England. It dates back to the late 18th century, replacing an earlier house. The two-storey building, with attic, has nine windows at the front and a stuccoed porch with Doric pilasters. Peckham Micklethwait of Iridge Place died in 1853, and the estate passed to Henry Sharnborne Nathaniel Micklethwait.

The local authority for the house is Rother District Council.

== Owners ==
Iridge was a tithing of Henhurst Hundred from 1248 (778 years ago) onwards, and first appears as a manor in 1539 (487 years ago) when Martin Brabon was in possession of it, the Brabon family having been in residence since at least 1327 (699 years ago).

The manor changed hands by marriage and conveyance a number of times during the 17th century, before ending up in the hands of William Peckham at the beginning of the 18th century.

#	Dates of Ownership	Owners Name	Born	Died	
	at least 1327–1537	Brabon family	-	-	
	1537 - Known	Martin Brandon	1505	1546	
	1556 - Unknown	John Wildegos	-	-	John Wildegos of London purchased in 1556 for £440 with an estimated 3 acres and he built a Chapel on the southside. It was reported in 1717 that the Chapel was in ruins and now no evidence of its existence remains.
	Unknown	Sir John Wildgoose	-	-	
	1637 - Unknown	Robert Wildgoose	-	-	
	Unknown - 1853	Sir (Sotherton Branthwayt) Peckham Micklethwait, 1st Baronet	1786	1853	The Peckham and Micklethwaite families resided at Iridge Place throughout the 18th Century and 19th Century. William Peckham was responsible for the building of the east front that exists today.
	1853 - Unknown	Henry Sharnborne Nathaniel Micklethwait	-	-	
	Unknown - 1932	Alfred Henry Chaytor, Esq., K.C [King's Counsel]	1869	1931	In 1932 following the death of Alfred Henry Chaytor, Esq., K.C the Estate was auctioned in 35 lots, but the Manorial Title lot (£90) remained unsold.
	Unknown	UK Highways Agency	n/a	n/a	Purchased under blight provisions of the Town & Country Planning Act 1990 or under the discretionary powers of the Highways Act 1980 and was not purchased using compulsory purchase.
	20XX onwards	Unknown	-	-	
