= George Courtauld =

George Courtauld may refer to:

- George Courtauld (industrialist, born 1761) (1761–1823), founder of Courtaulds
- George Courtauld (industrialist, born 1802) (1802–1861), textile manufacturer and son of the founder of Courtaulds
- George Courtauld (politician) (1830–1920), English politician
- George Courtauld (writer), British writer
