= Whiteash Green =

Hamlet in Essex, England

Coordinates: 51.947°N 0.609°E

White Ash Green
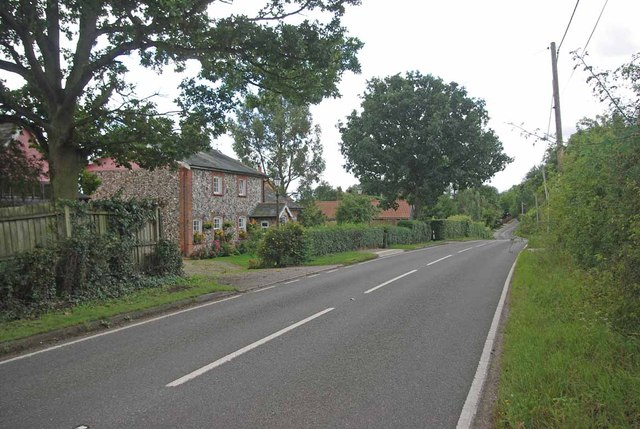

- Location within Essex
- Civil parish: Greenstead Green and Halstead Rural
- District: Braintree
- Shire county: Essex
- Region: East
- Country: England
- Sovereign state: United Kingdom
- Post town: HALSTEAD
- Postcode district: CO9
- Dialling code: 01787
- Police: Essex
- Fire: Essex
- Ambulance: East of England

White Ash Green is a hamlet in the civil parish of Greenstead Green and Halstead Rural, in the Braintree district of Essex, England.

It is a little over a mile west of the town of Halstead; the village of Gosfield is also nearby.

It comprises residential properties, 6 of which were built in the late 1890s by the Courtauld building company as accommodation for teachers at Gosfield residential school. The remainder of the properties are mostly cottages.

The Whitehouse business park is also located at the edge of White Ash Green.
