= George Courtauld (industrialist, born 1802) =

British textile manufacturer (1802–1861)

- Born: 1802; Pebmarsh, Essex, United Kingdom of Great Britain and Ireland
- Died: 1861 (aged 58–59)
- Organisation(s): Courtauld & Taylor (later, Courtaulds)
- Spouse(s): Susanna Courtauld, née Sewell
- Children: George Courtauld JP; Samuel Augustine Courtauld; Louis Courtauld; Susanna Ruth Courtauld; Sydney Courtauld JP
- Parents: George Courtauld; Ruth Courtauld, née Minton
- Family: Courtauld Family

George Courtauld (1802–1861) was a textile manufacturer and member of the Courtauld Family.

== Family ==
He was born in Pebmarsh, Essex in 1802, the younger son of George Courtauld and Ruth Minton. His elder brother was Samuel Courtauld, who succeeded their father as the senior partner of the family firm.

On 23 April 1829, in Halstead, Essex, he married Susanna Sewell (1803-1888). Their five children were:

- George Courtauld, J.P., (1830-1920)
- Samuel Augustine Courtauld (22 February 1833 – 23 September 1854)
- Louis Courtauld (2 September 1834) married Elizabeth Robinson 2 July 1862 in Croydon, Surrey
- Susanna Ruth Courtauld (4 June 1838) married Lewis Barrett Solly on 2 April 1864
- Sydney Courtauld, J.P., (1840-1899)

George and Susanna Courtauld were both buried at Gosfield, also in Essex, where many other members of the Courtauld family are also buried.

== America ==
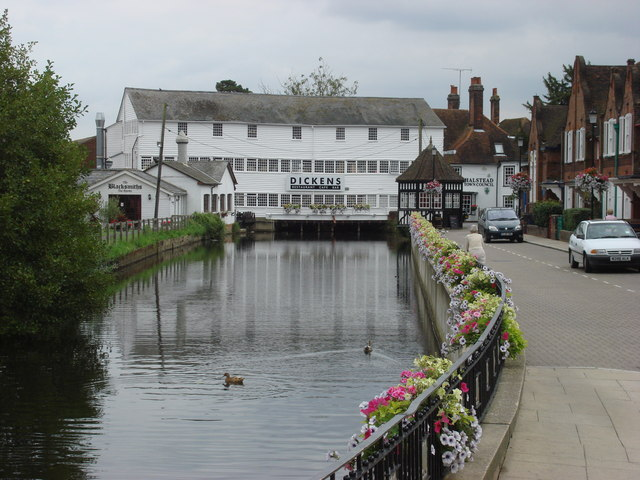
the Courtauld Silk Mill in Halstead, Essex

George Courtauld, sometimes referred to as George II Courtauld, spent four years in the United States of America with his father. The father, the elder George, had visited America in his youth and it had clearly created a deep impression upon him, as it was to America that he wished to return when he retired from the silk firm he had created, in 1816. The elder George returned to America in 1818 and managed to persuade his younger son to join him two years later. The son would now spend some youthful years in America, before returning to England and settling down to the responsibilities of running a silk business, exactly as his father had done before him. George the younger stayed with his father in his final years, until the old man died in 1823. He returned to England the following year, once he had wound up his father's and his own affairs in the United States.

== Business ==
In 1824 he joined his elder brother, Samuel Courtauld to work in the rapidly expanding silk and crepe manufactory. After a four-year apprenticeship in the business, he had earned his place on the board of management and in 1828, he took his place with his brother Samuel Courtauld and with Peter Taylor (1790-1850), the partner and cousin of his father the elder George, to become the junior partner in the newly restructured firm of Courtauld, Taylor and Courtauld. He continued to work for the family firm for the remainder of his life.

In the course of time, the kinsman Peter Taylor would retire and, in 1849, he was replaced by his own son who was also called Peter Taylor.
