= Courtauld (disambiguation) =

Courtauld is a surname.

Courtauld or Courtaulds may also refer to:

- Courtauld Institute of Art, a college of the University of London
  - Courtauld Gallery, an art museum
- Mount Courtauld, a mountain on Palmer Land, Antarctica
- Courtaulds, a former UK-based manufacturer, principally in the textile bysiness

== See also ==
- The Courtauld Talks, the eighth album by English post-punk group Killing Joke
