= Listed buildings in Greenstead Green and Halstead Rural =

Historic structures in Essex, England

Greenstead Green and Halstead Rural is a civil parish in the Braintree District of Essex, England. It contains 35 listed buildings that are recorded in the National Heritage List for England. Of these two are grade II* and 33 are grade II.

This list is based on the information retrieved online from Historic England.

== Key ==
Grade	Criteria
I	Buildings that are of exceptional interest
II*	Particularly important buildings of more than special interest
II	Buildings that are of special interest

== Listing ==
Name	Grade	Location	Type	Completed (Note: The date given is the date used by Historic England as significant for the initial building or that of an important part in the structure's description.)	Date designated	Grid ref. (Note: The grid reference is based on the British national grid reference system, sometimes known as OSGB36, used by the Ordnance Survey.) Geo-coordinates	Notes	Entry number (Note: The "List Entry Number" is a unique number assigned to each listed building and scheduled monument by Historic England.)	Image	Wikidata
Granry/maltings 10 Metres West of Aylett's Farmhouse and Attached Wall	II				10 April 1987	TL8029728594; 51°55′36″N 0°37′15″E		1306088	Upload Photo	Q26592898
Barn 30 Metres South West of Aylett's Farmhouse	II				10 April 1987	TL8029328556; 51°55′35″N 0°37′14″E		1123206	Upload Photo	Q26416298
Barn 70 Metres South of Stanstead Hall	II				7 August 1952	TL8271428802; 51°55′40″N 0°39′22″E		1123207	Upload Photo	Q26416299
Aylett's Farmhouse	II				10 April 1987	TL8031228592; 51°55′36″N 0°37′15″E		1123205	Upload Photo	Q26416297
Don John's Farmhouse	II				7 August 1952	TL8331328580; 51°55′32″N 0°39′52″E		1170467	Upload Photo	Q26463994
Highbarn Hall Farmhouse	II				10 April 1987	TL8009227785; 51°55′10″N 0°37′02″E		1337932	Upload Photo	Q26622290
Stanstead Hall	II*				7 August 1952	TL8269228880; 51°55′42″N 0°39′21″E		1170482	Upload Photo	Q17557629
Froyz Hall Farmhouse	II	Bournebridge Hill			10 April 1987	TL7955528554; 51°55′36″N 0°36′36″E		1170493	Upload Photo	Q26464039
Gateway and Railings to South and South East of Froyz Hall	II	Bournebridge Hill			10 April 1987	TL7955428545; 51°55′35″N 0°36′36″E		1337933	Upload Photo	Q26622291
Barn 40 Metres North of Greensteadhall Farmhouse	II	Church Road			10 April 1987	TL8222027955; 51°55′13″N 0°38′54″E		1170503	Upload Photo	Q26464054
Parish Church of St James	II	Church Road, Greenstead Green	church building		21 June 1962	TL8222728465; 51°55′30″N 0°38′55″E		1123208	Parish Church of St James More images	Q26416300
Parley Beams Farmhouse	II	Church Road			21 June 1962	TL8378729076; 51°55′47″N 0°40′18″E		1170716	Upload Photo	Q26464351
Walls,railings and Gate 10 Metres West of Bluebridge House	II	Railings And Gate 10 Metres West Of Bluebridge House, Colchester Road			21 June 1962	TL8262729730; 51°56′10″N 0°39′19″E		1170512	Upload Photo	Q26464072
Bluebridge House	II*	Colchester Road			7 August 1952	TL8264929720; 51°56′10″N 0°39′20″E		1337934	Upload Photo	Q17557897
Coach House 30 Metres South of Bluebridge House	II	Colchester Road			21 June 1962	TL8264629679; 51°56′08″N 0°39′20″E		1123209	Upload Photo	Q26416301
The Cottage	II	Crocklands Corner			10 April 1987	TL8239028150; 51°55′19″N 0°39′03″E		1123210	Upload Photo	Q26416302
Gladfen Hall Farmhouse	II	Gladfen Hall Road			7 August 1952	TL8107128266; 51°55′24″N 0°37′55″E		1170729	Upload Photo	Q26464375
Ward's Farmhouse	II	Gladfen Hall Road			10 April 1987	TL8105527834; 51°55′11″N 0°37′53″E		1337935	Upload Photo	Q26622292
Old School and School House	II	Greenstead Green			6 April 1993	TL8228428450; 51°55′29″N 0°38′58″E		1237336	Upload Photo	Q26530485
The Old Vicarage	II	Greenstead Green			6 April 1993	TL8223328533; 51°55′32″N 0°38′56″E		1140095	Upload Photo	Q26432892
Barn 60 Metres West North West of Whitehouse Farmhouse	II	Halstead Road			10 April 1987	TL7984330981; 51°56′54″N 0°36′55″E		1123211	Upload Photo	Q26416303
Whitehouse Farmhouse	II	Halstead Road			10 April 1987	TL7980530991; 51°56′54″N 0°36′53″E		1170737	Upload Photo	Q26464387
Bushey Leys	II	Oak Road			10 April 1987	TL8071228868; 51°55′44″N 0°37′37″E		1170744	Upload Photo	Q26464394
Plaistowgreen Farmhouse	II	Plaistowgreen Road			10 April 1987	TL8076928056; 51°55′18″N 0°37′38″E		1337936	Upload Photo	Q26622293
Rivenshall	II	Ravens Hall Road			7 August 1952	TL8199627793; 51°55′08″N 0°38′42″E		1123212	Upload Photo	Q26416305
Highwoods Farmhouse	II	Russell's Road			10 April 1987	TL7946229626; 51°56′10″N 0°36′33″E		1305922	Upload Photo	Q26592746
Sloe House	II	Sloe Hill			6 February 1986	TL8029431032; 51°56′55″N 0°37′19″E		1123213	Upload Photo	Q26416306
Barn 40 Metres South East of Perces Farmhouse	II	Stisted Road			10 April 1987	TL8251827331; 51°54′53″N 0°39′08″E		1170782	Upload Photo	Q26464447
Clavering's Farmhouse	II	Stisted Road			7 August 1952	TL8200526812; 51°54′36″N 0°38′41″E		1123214	Upload Photo	Q26416307
Granary 30 Metres South East of Perces Farmhouse	II	Stisted Road			10 April 1987	TL8249627319; 51°54′52″N 0°39′07″E		1337937	Upload Photo	Q26622294
Hill Cottage	II	Stisted Road			13 November 1978	TL8223427437; 51°54′56″N 0°38′54″E		1305928	Upload Photo	Q26592752
Ashford Lodge Gatehouse	II	Sudbury Road			10 April 1987	TL8238432462; 51°57′39″N 0°39′11″E		1123172	Upload Photo	Q26416265
Barn 30 Metres North West of Bentall's Farmhouse	II	Sudbury Road			10 April 1987	TL8216232186; 51°57′30″N 0°38′59″E		1170791	Upload Photo	Q26464459
Star Stile House	II	Sudbury Road			23 January 1980	TL8240631698; 51°57′14″N 0°39′11″E		1305902	Upload Photo	Q26592728
Letche's Farmhouse	II	Tiding Hill			10 April 1987	TL8097628933; 51°55′46″N 0°37′51″E		1337957	Upload Photo	Q26622312

== See also ==
- Grade I listed buildings in Essex
- Grade II* listed buildings in Essex

== Sources ==
- Bettley, James; Pevsner, Nikolaus (2007) [1954], Essex, The Buildings of England, New Haven and London: Yale University Press, ISBN 978-0-300-11614-4
