= Samuel Courtauld =

Samuel Courtauld may refer to:

- Samuel Courtauld (industrialist) (1793–1881), American-born British industrialist
- Samuel Courtauld (art collector) (1876–1947), businessman and art collector; great-nephew of the above
