= Greenstead Green and Halstead Rural =

Civil parish in Essex, England

- Civil parish
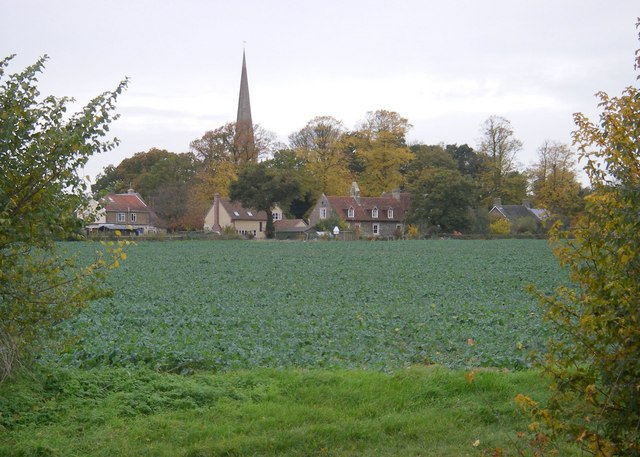
- Greenstead Green church
- Interactive map of Greenstead Green and Halstead Rural
- Coordinates: 51.934349°N 0.65333093°E
- Country: England
- Primary council: Braintree
- County: Essex
- Region: East of England
- Halstead Rural: 1894
- Status: Parish
- Main settlements: Greenstead Green, Burton's Green, Plaistow Green and Whiteash Green

Area
  - Total: 17.71 km^{2} (6.84 sq mi)

Population (2021)
  - Total: 665
  - Density: 37.5/km^{2} (97.3/sq mi)
- Website: https://www.greensteadgreenpc.org.uk/

Greenstead Green and Halstead Rural is a civil parish in the Braintree district of Essex, England. The parish was created in 1894 from the rural parts of the old parish of Halstead, and covers areas to the north, west, and south of the town. The largest settlement in the parish is the village of Greenstead Green. Other settlements in the parish include the hamlets of Burton's Green, Plaistow Green, and Whiteash Green. At the 2021 census the parish had a population of 665.

In addition to Halstead, the other neighbouring parishes are Coggeshall, Colne Engaine, Earls Colne, Gosfield, Great Maplestead, Little Maplestead, Pebmarsh, Sible Hedingham and Stisted.

== History ==
The area historically formed part of the ancient parish of Halstead. In 1852, the parish was made a local board district, administered by an elected local board. It was subsequently decided that the whole parish should not be included in the local board district, and so in 1866 the district was redefined to just cover the parts of the parish within a 1,000-yard (914 m) radius of the bridge over the River Colne in the centre of the town.

Such local board districts were reconstituted as urban districts under the Local Government Act 1894, which also directed that civil parishes could no longer straddle district boundaries. The old Halstead parish was therefore split into a Halstead Urban parish matching the urban district and a Halstead Rural parish covering the remainder of the old parish outside the urban district. On 1 October 1934, 527 acres (213 hectares) was transferred to Halstead Urban.

The parish of Halstead Rural was later renamed Greenstead Green and Halstead Rural to incorporate the name of its largest settlement. The change of name happened sometime in the 1960s or early 1970s; sources conflict on exactly when it occurred. (Note: UKBMD says the change of name was in 1974, but the Ordnance Survey was showing the new name from 1968. Vision of Britain says that the change of name was reported in the 1971 census as having occurred since the previous census in 1961, but note that further research had been unable to find a definitive date for the change.)

The parish contains a number of buildings of historical note. There are 35 listed buildings in the parish and two scheduled ancient monuments.

== Governance ==
There are three tiers of local government covering Greenstead Green and Halstead Rural, at parish, district, and county level: Greenstead Green and Halstead Rural Parish Council, Braintree District Council, and Essex County Council. The parish council meets at Greenstead Green Village Hall.
