= French Protestant Church of London =

Coordinates: 51°30′57″N 0°07′59″W

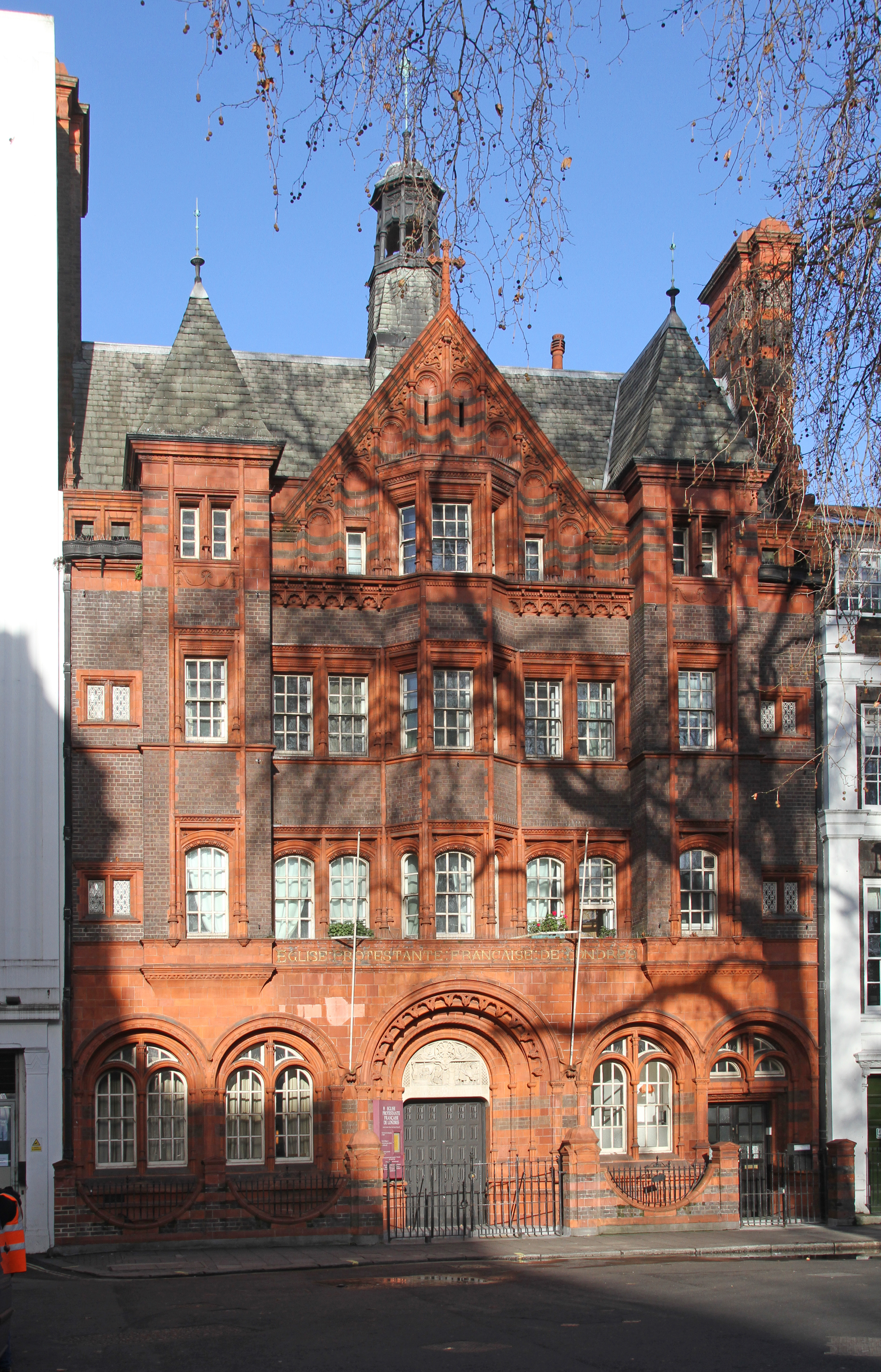
- Front of the building in Soho Square

- Location within Greater London
- Location: Soho, London
- Country: England
- Denomination: Reformed
- Tradition: Liberal Christianity
- Website: French Protestant Church of London

History
- Founded: 24 July 1550
- Founder: Edward VI

Architecture
- Heritage designation: Grade II* Listed
- Architect: Aston Webb
- Groundbreaking: 28 October 1891
- Completed: 25 March 1893

Clergy
- Pastor: Phoebe Woods

The French Protestant Church of London (Église protestante française de Londres) is a Reformed/Presbyterian church that has catered to the French-speaking community of London since 1550. It is the last remaining Huguenot church of London. Its current temple in Soho Square is a Grade II* listed building designed by Aston Webb and erected in 1891–1893.

== History ==
The church was founded by a royal charter of King Edward VI on 24 July 1550.

At the request of the Huguenots of London, in 1560 John Calvin sent a trusted emissary from Geneva, pastor Nicolas des Gallars, to help provide the young congregation its Reformed theology and Presbyterian organisation.

In 1700, at the height of the French refugee population following the Revocation of the Edict of Nantes in 1685, 23 Huguenot places of worship existed in London. Soho remained remained an important centre of the French community into the 19th century and the church's temple is the only one that is active today: the French Protestant Church in Brighton (opened in 1887) closed in 2008.

== Organisation ==
The church is a registered charity under English law. A related charity, The French Huguenot Church of London Charitable Trust, provides funds for the church and other charitable objects.

Stéphane Desmarais became the pastor on 1 September 2013.

== Sources ==
- Yves Jaulmes, The French Protestant Church of London and the Huguenots: from the Church's foundation to the present day, published by the French Protestant Church of London, 1993, p. 59 ISBN 0952120607.
- Manifesto, (or Declaration of Principles), of the French Protestant Church of London, Founded by Charter of Edward VI. 24th July, A.D. 1550. By Order of the Consistory. London: Messrs. Seeleys, 1850.
- The Economist, Changing Shadows: The many mansions in one east London house of God, 18 December 2003, https://www.economist.com/christmas-specials/2003/12/18/changing-shadows
- Listing Entry by Historic England
- The French Protestant Church, British History Online

== Gallery ==
Temple of the French Protestant Church of London

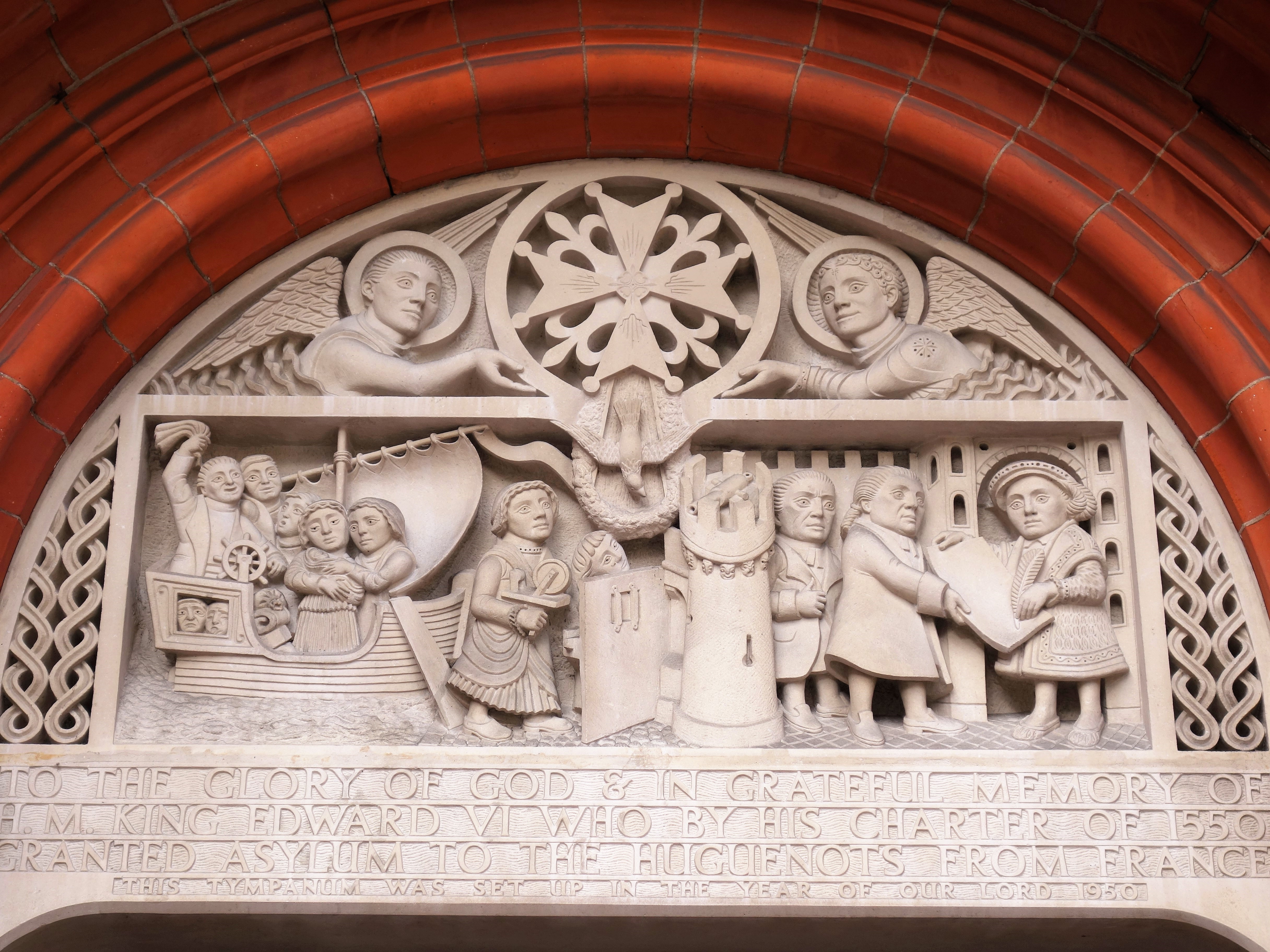
Tympanum installed for the 400th anniversary of the Church in 1950

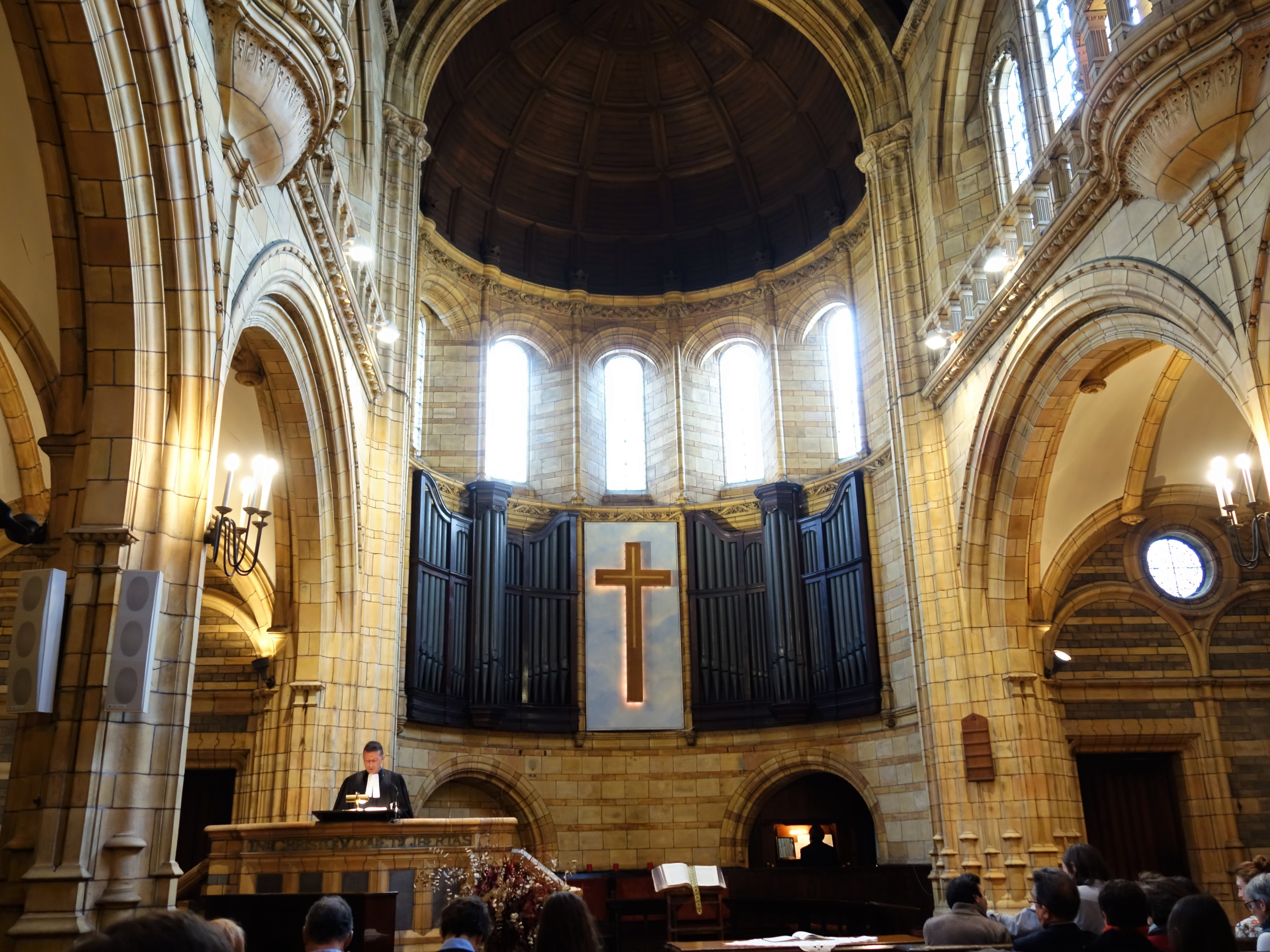
Sunday service at the French Protestant Church of London with pastor Stéphane Desmarais
World Wars

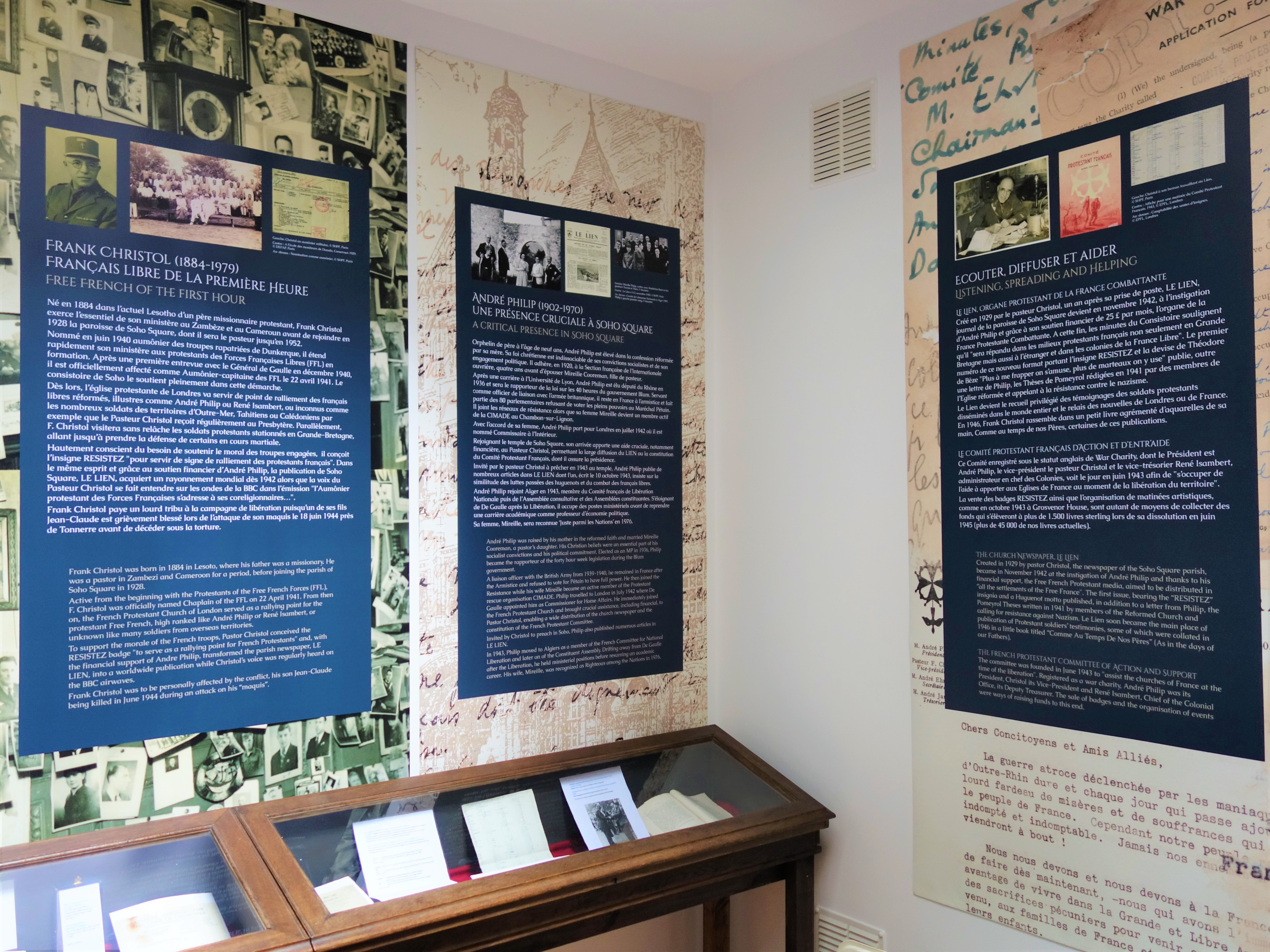
WW2 museum in the temple of the French Protestant Church of London

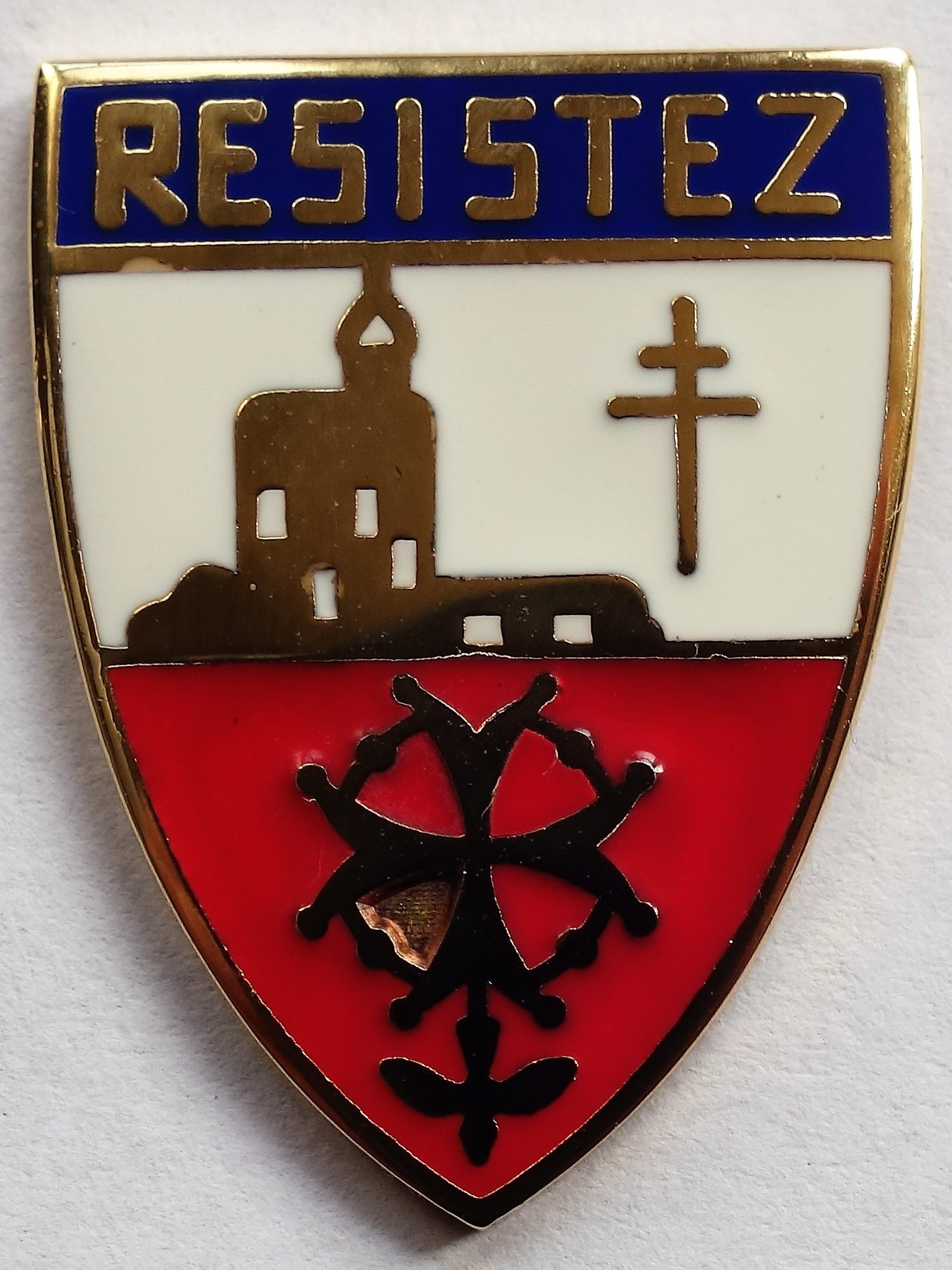
Emblem designed by pastor Christol for use by members of the Church and of the Free French Forces (1942 version)

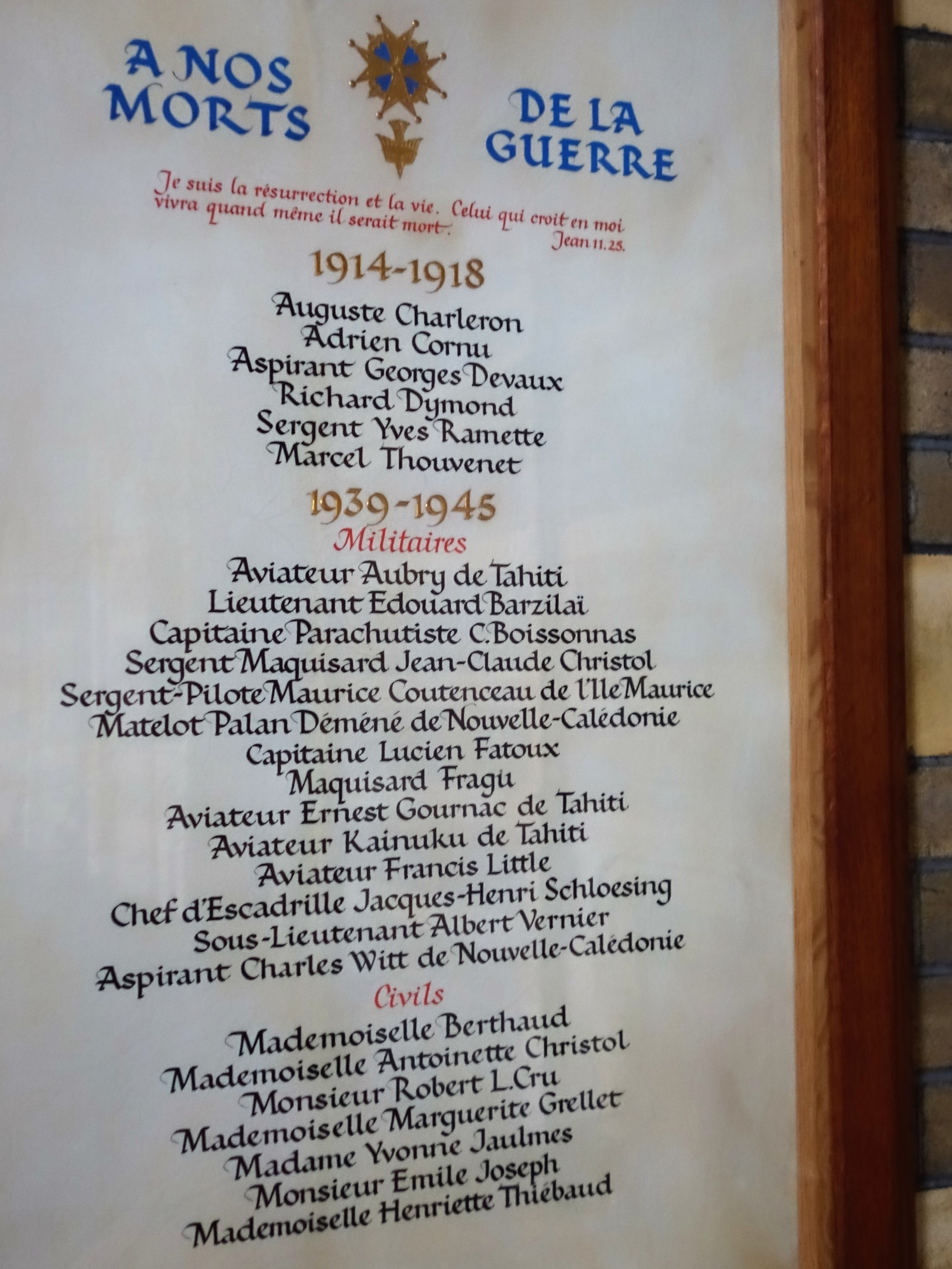
Plate "to our war dead" in the temple

== See also ==
- John Houblon
- Courtauld family
- French Protestant Church, Brighton
