= Courtauld =

Courtauld is a surname. Notable people with the surname include:

- Adam Courtauld Butler or Adam Butler (British politician), DL (1931–2008), British Conservative Party politician and MP
- Augustine Courtauld (1904–1959), often called August Courtauld, was a yachtsman and British Arctic explorer
- Courtauld Courtauld-Thomson, 1st Baron Courtauld-Thomson CB, KBE (1865–1954), British businessman and holder of public and charitable offices
- George Courtauld (disambiguation), list of people with the name
- John Sewell Courtauld (1880–1942), English Conservative Party politician
- Louisa Courtauld (née Ogier) (1729–1807), English silversmith
- Samuel Courtauld (art collector) (1876–1947), English industrialist best remembered as an art collector
- Samuel Courtauld (industrialist) (1793–1881), industrialist and Unitarian, the driving force behind the growth of the Courtaulds textile business
- Sir Stephen Courtauld, MC (1883–1967), member of the wealthy English Courtauld textile family
- Sydney Courtauld JP (1840–1899), Crepe and Silk manufacturer, and part of the Courtauld family empire in Great Britain
- William Julien Courtauld (1870–1940), 1st Baronet Courtauld of Penny Pot, and part of the Courtauld family empire in Great Britain

== See also ==
- Courtauld Family
