= Louisa Courtauld =

French born English silversmith (1729 - 1807)

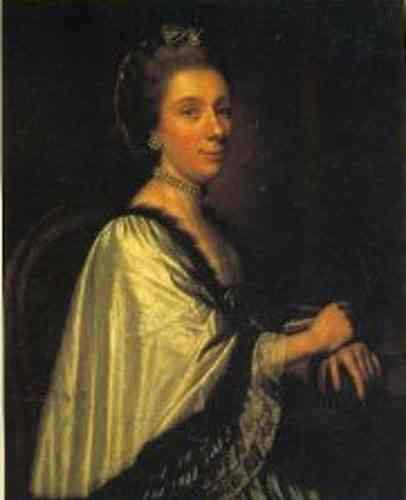
- Louisa Courtauld, c. 1770
- Born: Louisa Perina Ogier; 1729; Moncoutant, Deux-Sèvres, France
- Died: 12 January 1807 (aged 78); Clapton, Hackney, London, England
- Resting place: Christ Church Spitalfields (1807–1980s); Church of St Catherine, Gosfield, Braintree District, Essex (2002–)
- Known for: Silversmith
- Movement: Rococo, Neoclassicism
- Spouse: Samuel Courtauld
- Children: 8, including George Courtauld
- Parents: Pierre Abraham Ogier; Catherine Rabaud
- Relatives: Augustin Courtauld (father-in-law)
- Family: Courtauld Family

Louisa Perina Courtauld (née Ogier; 1729 – 12 January 1807) was a French-born English silversmith.

== Biography ==
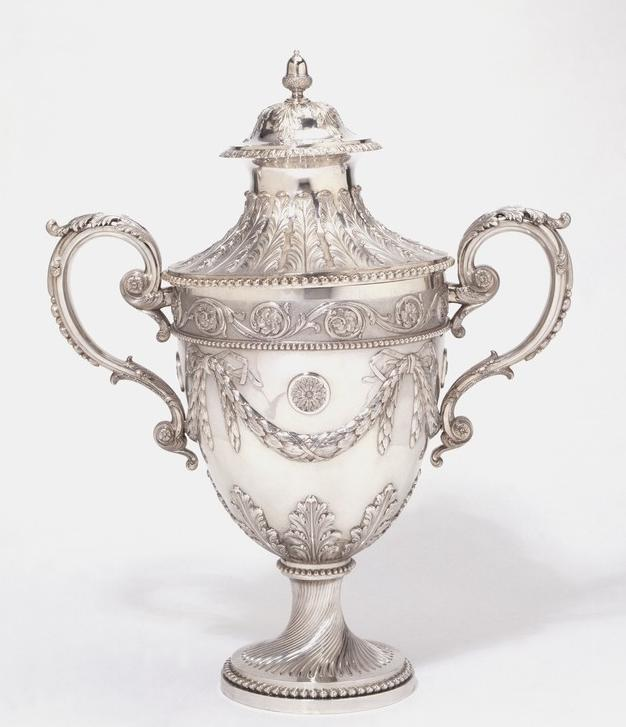
Cup and cover, 1771–1772 (hallmarked), Louisa Courtauld and George Cowles V&A Museum no. 804:1, 2-1890

She was the youngest daughter of Huguenots from Sigournay in Poitou, France. Her parents were a silk weaver from France, Pierre Abraham Ogier and his wife Catherine Rabaud. Louisa Courtauld and her family moved to London when she was young, the city in which she spent most of her career. Her family's home at 19 Princelet Street, a 'brick messuage' built in 1719, has been conserved as a museum of immigration and diversity.

At the age of 20 she married Samuel Courtauld, son of Augustin Courtauld, a metalsmith of Huguenot extraction. With him she had eight children, although only four survived, and their son George, apprenticed in 1761 to a silk throwster, began the link to the textile company Courtaulds.

They ran a successful business until Samuel Courtauld's death in 1765. Her own hallmark was registered with the Goldsmiths' Company around 1766. After her husband died, she inherited the business and continued to run it by herself until 1769. Some years later, she took on George Cowles, who had been the head apprentice, as a business partner. In 1777 her son, Samuel Courtauld II, replaced Cowles in that capacity and they registered a new joint hallmark. This arrangement lasted three years; when it ended the two closed the business and it was sold to John Henderson. Samuel moved to America, while Louisa retired to Essex.

Courtauld's firm was known for the high quality of its wares. She and her husband made their reputation with silver in the then-popular Rococo style from France. However, by the time of her partnership with Cowles, tastes had shifted towards Neoclassicism, and the company changed its output accordingly.

Courtauld's father-in-law Augustin Courtauld had studied with Simon Pantin, whose daughter, Elizabeth Godfrey, was to become with Courtauld one of the very few female silversmiths of distinction in eighteenth-century London.

Louisa Courtauld's portrait was painted, possibly by Johann Zoffany, whose commissions included members of the British royal family. It is more probable that Nathaniel Dance-Holland painted this portrait.

As a widow, she may have lived in a cottage behind Joseph Priestley's house off Clapton Square on the corner of Clapton Passage and Lower Clapton Road in Hackney. She is also recorded as living in Clapton in Essex. Her last will and testament, probated 27 January 1807, identifies her as "Louisa Perina Courtauld, Widow of Saint John Hackney, Middlesex." She was originally buried in the vault of Christ Church, Spitalfields, East London. However, following extensive archaeological excavation of the Spitalfields church crypt in the 1980s, prior to the church's restoration, her body was removed and examined. Her remains were reburied in Gosfield Church, Essex in 2002.
