= Tumbler's Green =

Hamlet in Essex, England

Coordinates: 51.902°N 0.629°E

- Location within Essex
- Civil parish: Stisted
- District: Braintree
- Shire county: Essex
- Region: East
- Country: England
- Sovereign state: United Kingdom
- Police: Essex
- Fire: Essex
- Ambulance: East of England

Tumbler's Green is a hamlet in the civil parish of Stisted, in the Braintree district, in the county of Essex, England. It is near the towns of Halstead and Braintree, other nearby settlements include Folly Green, Pattiswick, Stisted and Greenstead Green.
