= Gosfield Sandpits =

Nature reserve in Essex, United Kingdom

Coordinates: 51.9353°N 0.59657°E

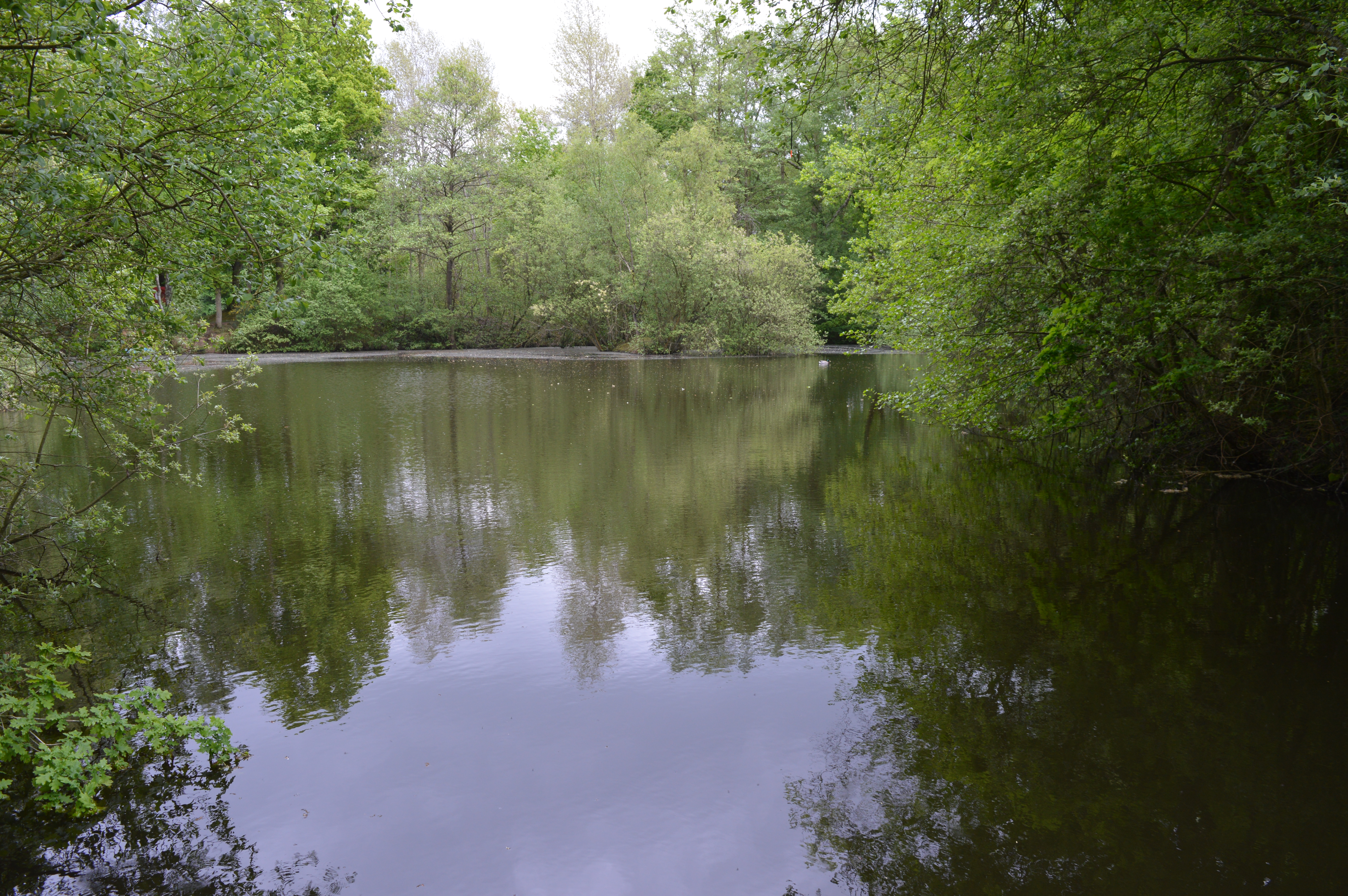
- Interactive map of Gosfield Sandpits
- Type: Local Nature Reserve
- Location: Braintree, Essex
- OS grid: TL786295
- Area: 8.3 hectares (21 acres)
- Manager: Gosfield Parish Council and Braintree District Council

Gosfield Sandpits is an 8.3 hectare Local Nature Reserve in Gosfield, north of Braintree in Essex. It is owned by Gosfield Parish Council, and managed by the Parish Council and Braintree District Council.

The site is an area of former sandpits which has around a mile of footpaths, woodland, an open glade and many ponds. There is a wide variety of trees, and flowers include wood anemones and bluebells. It is described by Natural England as an area of outstanding natural beauty.

There is access by footpaths from The Street and Halstead Road.
