= Holy Trinity Church, Halstead =

Coordinates: 51.9435°N 0.6296°E

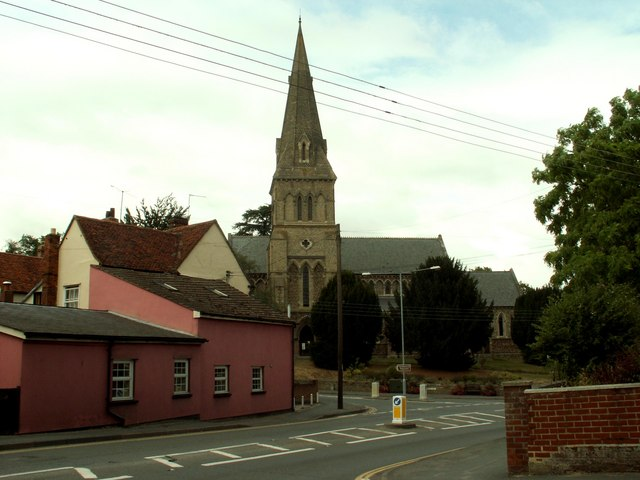
- Holy Trinity Church, Halstead, from the south

- Location in Essex
- OS grid reference: TL 808 305
- Location: Halstead, Essex
- Country: England
- Denomination: Anglican
- Website: Churches Conservation Trust

Architecture
- Functional status: Redundant
- Heritage designation: Grade II*
- Designated: 16 March 1978
- Architect: George Gilbert Scott
- Architectural type: Church
- Style: Gothic Revival
- Groundbreaking: 1843
- Completed: 1876
- Construction cost: £3,000

Specifications
- Materials: Brick with flint facing Gault brick and limestone dressings Roofs slated with ridge tiles

Holy Trinity Church is a redundant Anglican church in the town of Halstead, Essex, England. It is recorded in the National Heritage List for England as a designated Grade II* listed building, and is under the care of the Churches Conservation Trust. The church stands to the north of the junction between Trinity Street (the A131 road) and Chapel Hill.

== History ==
A chapel, Holy Trinity Chapel, was built on the site in about 1413, but this had disappeared by the 18th century. The present church was built in 1843–44, and most of it was paid for by Mrs Mary Gee of Colne House, Earls Colne. A grant of £500 came from funds provided by Parliament in the Church Building Act 1824.

The church was designed by George Gilbert Scott. As the building of the spire was nearing completion, it collapsed, fortunately causing only minor injuries to the builders. An organ chamber was added in 1876. The church was declared redundant in April 1987.

== Architecture ==
=== Exterior ===
Holy Trinity is constructed in brick with flint facing. It has gault brick and limestone dressings. The roofs are slated with tiles on the ridges. Its plan consists of a nave with a clerestory, north and south aisles, a chancel, a northeast vestry, an organ chamber, and a southwest tower with a spire. The tower incorporates a porch. It is a Gothic Revival church in 13th-century Early English style. The tower is tall with four stages. On its south side is a doorway. The second and third stages contain single-lancet windows flanked by arcading. In the third stage is a quatrefoil opening on each side. The bell openings consist of a pair of narrow lancets, with blind arches on each side. On the tower is a broach spire with two tiers of lucarnes. In the gable at the east end of the church is a wheel window, with spokes radiating from a hub. Below this are three lancet windows of equal height. At all corners of the church are clasping buttresses. The sides of the aisles are divided into bays by buttresses, and each bay contains a lancet window. Along the clerestory is arcading with alternate blind arches and lancet windows. At the west end is a doorway, above which is a triple lancet window, with a single lancet above that.

=== Interior ===
The walls are plastered and whitewashed. Between the nave and the aisles on each side is a six-bay arcade supported by alternating circular and octagonal piers. The seating in the nave and aisles, and probably the font, with its square bowl on an octagonal base, date from the time of the building of the church. The lectern dates from 1906, and the choir stalls were added in 1913. The panelling in the chancel, and the pulpit date from the early 20th century. At the east end of the south aisle is a memorial screen added in 1922. The stained glass in the west window dates from 1851 and is by Clutterbuck, the east window of 1887 is by Burlison and Grylls, the east window in the south aisle dated 1922 is by J. C. N. Bewsey, and three windows in the south aisle of 1931–32 are by A. K. Nicholson. The three-manual organ was made in 1858. In 1878 E. W. Norman of Norwich and Diss either rebuilt it or supplied a new organ. This was subsequently restored in 1909 by Binns of Leeds, again in about 1970 by Cedric Arnold, Williamson & Hyatt of Thaxted, and at a later date by Bishop and Son.

== See also ==
- List of churches preserved by the Churches Conservation Trust in the East of England
