= French Protestant Church, Brighton =

L'Eglise Française Réformée
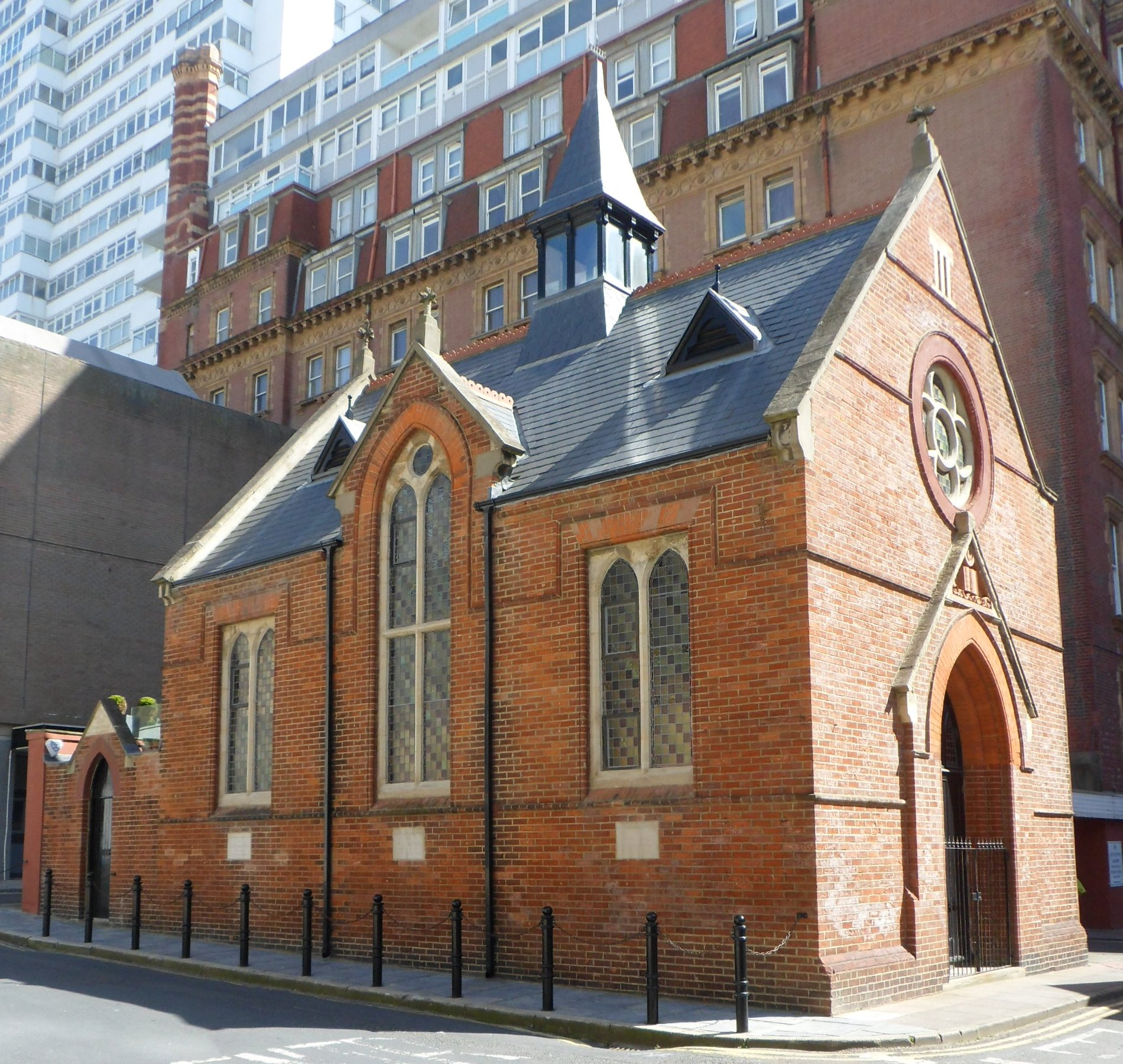
- Side view of the former church, with the Metropole Hotel behind
- L'Eglise Française Réformée
- 50.8220°N 0.1495°W
- Location: Queensbury Mews, Brighton, Brighton and Hove, East Sussex BN1 2FE
- Country: England
- Denomination: Reformed Church of France

History
- Status: Church
- Founded: 1858
- Dedicated: 1887

Architecture
- Functional status: Closed
- Architect: W. G. Gibbins
- Style: Gothic Revival
- Completed: 1887
- Closed: 2008

The French Protestant Church of Brighton (L'Eglise Française Réformée) is a former place of worship in the English city of Brighton and Hove. Until its closure in 2008, it was the only French Protestant church in Britain outside London, where the French Protestant Church of London, founded in 1550, occupies a building dating from 1893 in Soho Square. Brighton's dates from the previous decade, and is centrally located in Queensbury Mews, a small street just behind Brighton seafront and next to the Metropole Hotel. Opened in 1887, it was put up for sale in June 2008 and was closed a month later.

== History ==
In 1548, Dirick Carver, a French-speaking Flemish man from a town near Liège, sought refuge in Brighton from the persecution he was experiencing from the ruling powers of the time in respect of his Calvinist beliefs. He had been a lay reader; as well as establishing Brighton's first brewery, the Black Lion, he held Bible reading sessions at his house in Brighton for the next few years until Roman Catholicism was re-established as Britain's state religion by Queen Mary I in 1553. At this time, such meetings of Protestants were banned, and Carver was arrested and committed to trial in London for continuing to hold them. He was burnt at the stake in 1555.

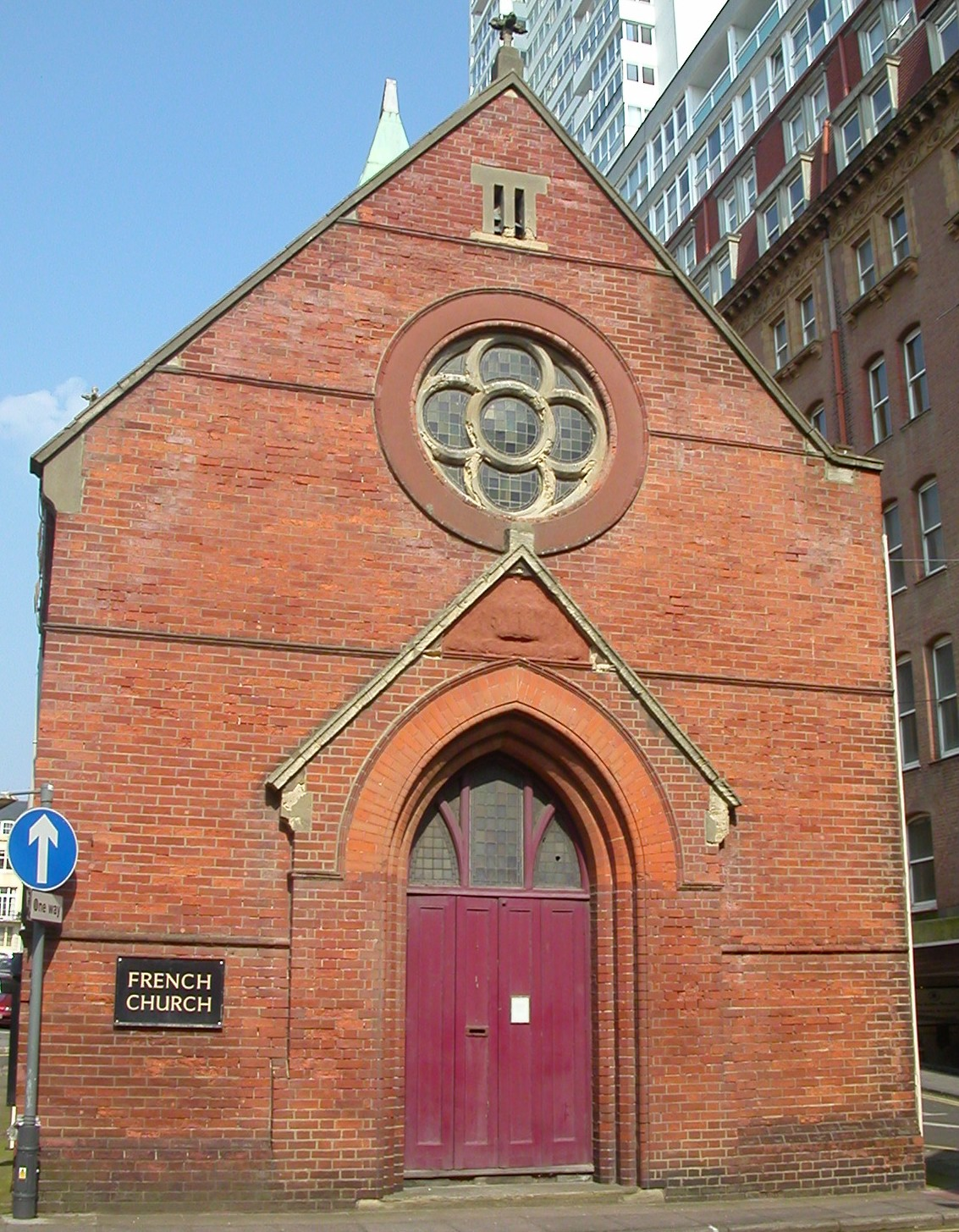
Main entrance and rose window, on the south side

The meetings had been attended by many fishermen from both England and France, beginning the tradition of French Christian worship in Brighton. In the 17th and 18th centuries, this was maintained in a Presbyterian chapel in the centre of the town, which was attended by many Francophone worshippers. Calvinists, meanwhile, met secretly in private houses until an official church was formed for the Francophone population in 1858. The first two pastors were French, as were many members of the committee formed later to assist the church council. However, a Brighton resident, Mrs E. Hayes, played a significant role in bringing the church community together. Services were initially held at her house, and later in various churches and public buildings in the town; but in 1887 the pastor oversaw the building of a dedicated church for the congregation. A plot of land behind Kings Road was bought for £735, and building materials cost another £800. Money was raised from the congregation itself, Protestant congregations in France and people within Brighton's religious community. Mrs Hayes coordinated the fundraising and donated some money herself. These efforts were criticised by Rev. J. Gregory in his sermon at the dedication ceremony on 18 July 1887; he described fundraising in general as "stirring the Lord's fire with the devil's poker", and complained about the activities that were organised, saying that they did not fit "with the Lord's work".

A time capsule was set into the main foundation stone, containing items associated with Queen Victoria's Golden Jubilee. The stone was laid by the Mayor of Brighton using a specially made trowel, and the church was consecrated on 27 February 1888.

The church was licensed for worship in accordance with the Places of Worship Registration Act 1855 and had the registration number 30558.

== Architecture ==
Designed in red-brick Gothic style by the architect W. G. Gibbins, the church has three pairs of lancet windows in the western face, a pointed-arch entrance door and rose window in quatrefoil form in the southern face, a slate roof and a small copper spire on top of a square turret.

== The church today ==
At the start of the 20th century, there were around 2,000 French speakers in Brighton, many of them Protestants, but the community is now much smaller. There was, however, a weekly service (in French and English) at 11.00am on Sundays.

The building was offered for sale in June 2008, as its trustees decided they could no longer maintain it. Services were held at the church until it was sold; the last service was on 26 July 2008. The congregation was reported to be planning to find alternative accommodation in the city. At the time of closure, demolition was considered unlikely: it was expected that the building would be converted for residential or commercial use, and the time capsule would be retained. Between 2009 and 2010 conversion work was carried out, and the church is now a house. The exterior and many of the interior features remain unchanged.

== See also ==
- List of places of worship in Brighton and Hove
- St Mary the Less, Norwich (L’Église Protestante Française de Norwich)

== Bibliography ==
- Collis, Rose (2010). The New Encyclopaedia of Brighton. (based on the original by Tim Carder) (1st ed.). Brighton: Brighton & Hove Libraries. ISBN 978-0-9564664-0-2.
- Dale, Antony (1989). Brighton Churches. London: Routledge. ISBN 0-415-00863-8.
