= Thomas Millington (physician) =

English physician (1628–1704)

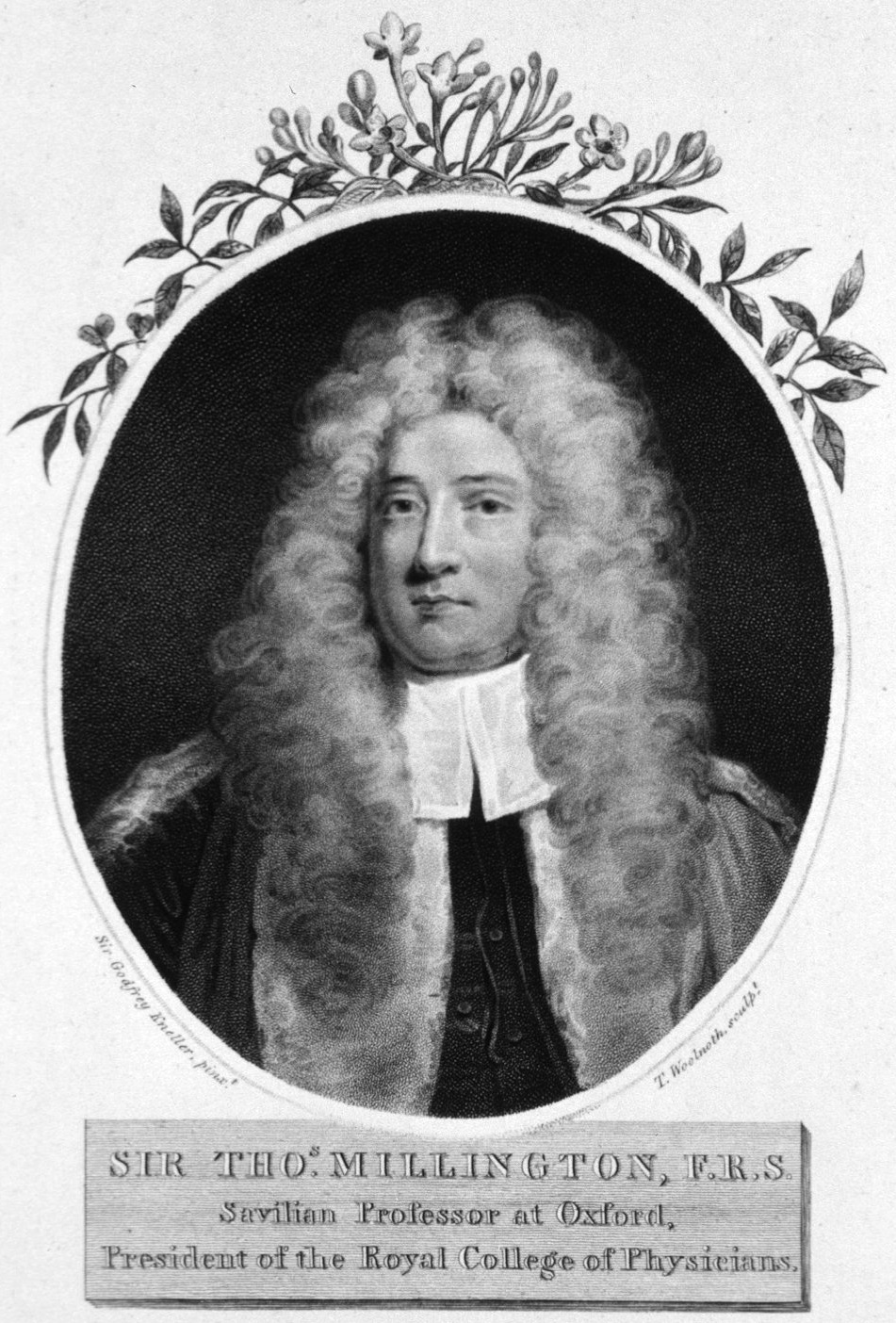
Thomas Millington

Sir Thomas Millington FRS (1628 in Newbury – 5 January 1704 in Gosfield), the son of Thomas Millington, was an English physician. Greatly respected in his day, he was eulogised by Samuel Garth under the name of Machaon in his poem "The Dispensary", and Thomas Sydenham held him in high regard.

== Life ==
Thomas Millington received his education at Richard Busby's Westminster School, and then in 1645, at Trinity College, Cambridge under James Duport. From here he graduated AB in 1649, and moved on to Oxford University, obtaining his AM. He was elected a fellow of All Souls College and became a doctor of medicine at Oxford on 9 July 1659. In the preface to the 1664 work Cerebri anatome, Thomas Willis describes him as a "most learned man, to whom I from day to day proposed privately my Conjectures and Observations, often confirmed by his Suffrage, being uncertain in mind, and not trusting to my own opinion".

Appointed to the chair of Sedleian Professor of Natural Philosophy in 1675, a position he held for life. Admitted as a candidate for the College of Physicians in 1659, he became a Fellow of the Royal College of Physicians in 1672. He was in turn Censor, Harveian Orator, Treasurer, Consiliarius and President, and was present at the deathbed of Charles II.

After his admittance to the College of Physicians, he was said to be "the delight of it; affable in his conversation, firm in his friendships, diligent and happy in his practice, candid and open in consultations, eloquent to an extraordinary degree in his public speeches; being chosen President, his behaviour was grave, tempered with courtesy, steady without obstinacy, continually intent on the good of the College." He was appointed physician in ordinary to William III and Mary II, and later to Queen Anne. Millington was knighted in 1679. He was one of the physicians to dissect William III's body.

Millington had ventured in a conversation with Nehemiah Grew that the stamen ("attire") serves as the male organ for the production of the seed. Grew at once "replied that he was of the same opinion, gave some reasons for thinking so, and answered some objections which might be made to it."

Grew further explored this idea and found that stamens with their thecae are male sex organs while pistils represent the female organs. These ideas were published by Grew in the Anatomy of Plants in 1682, which is today regarded as a major milepost in the development of botanical science.

In 1691 he was living at Gosfield Hall and was responsible for a great deal of reconstruction. His family coat of arms is displayed in the hall and consists of the "blazon of a silver shield, thereon a black eagle displayed with two heads, the crest being a bull's head erased", and the motto Virtutis proemium honor ("Honour the reward of virtue"). He married Hannah King, the widow of Henry King, on 23 February 1680. The union produced a son, Thomas (notorious as a rake), and two daughters, Anne and Mary.

According to unsubstantiated family stories, a certain "Lady Anne" followed her lover, a British army officer, to America, but eventually married Gershom Lockwood of Greenwich. The story of this woman's aristocratic roots is supported by her receipt of an ornate chest in the 1660s filled with "half a bushel of guineas and many fine silk dresses". These sources however fail to substantiate a paternal link between this woman and Sir Thomas. Indeed, Parliamentary probate records successfully demonstrate Anne Millington, daughter of Sir Thomas Millington as having died intestate, unmarried and childless.

Thomas Millington was laid to rest on 28 January 1704, in the Wentworth Chapel of Gosfield church. A monument of Purbeck marble to his memory was destroyed some sixty years on by looters who tore up the brasswork. There is a good portrait of Millington at the College. Linnaeus named the genus Millingtonia in the Bignoniaceae in his honour.
