= George Courtauld (politician) =

English cloth manufacturer and Liberal Party politician (1830 - 1920)

George Courtauld MP, JP

Member of Parliament for Maldon
- In office December 1878 – December 1885
- Monarch: Queen Victoria

High Sheriff of Essex
- In office 1896–1896
- Monarch: Queen Victoria

Personal details
- Born: 11 August 1830
- Died: 29 February 1920 (aged 89)
- Party: Liberal Party
- Spouses: Mina Courtauld, née Bromley (m. 1855; died 1859) Susanna Elizabeth Courtauld, née Savill (m. 1864; died 1879) Serena Elizabeth Courtauld (m. 1888)
- Relations: Courtauld Family
- Children: 13, including Katharine Courtauld
- Parents: George Courtauld; Susanna Courtauld, née Sewell
- Education: University College London

George Courtauld (11 August 1830 – 29 February 1920) was an English cloth manufacturer and Liberal Party politician who sat in the House of Commons from 1878 to 1885.

== Early life and education ==
George Courtauld was born on 11 August 1830 to George Courtauld and Susanna Courtauld, née Sewell. Courtauld was baptised on 8 December 1831 in Bocking.

Courtauld was educated at University College, London and became a partner in the firm of Samuel Courtauld & Co which had been established by his grandfather George Courtauld. He was High Sheriff of Essex in 1896 and a Justice of the Peace for Essex.

== Politics ==
In December 1878 Courtauld was elected at a by-election as the Liberal Member of Parliament (MP) for Maldon. He held the seat until 1885. He was a Unitarian and supported social reform and suffrage extension.

== Personal life ==
In 1855, Courtauld married Mina Courtauld (1833–1859; née Bromley) at St Mark's Church. In 1864, Courtauld married Susanna Elizabeth (1839–1879; née Savill) at St. James Church. In 1888, Courtauld married Serena Elizabeth Courtauld (1853– July 1920; née Sparrow). Courtauld and his wives had in total 13 children. His children included Katharine Courtauld and Elizabeth Courtauld. He was the grandfather of Augustine Courtauld.

Parliament of the United Kingdom
Preceded by George Sandford	Member of Parliament for Maldon; 1878–1885	Succeeded by Arthur George Kitching
