= Greenstead Green =

Village in Essex, England

Coordinates: 51.921°N 0.649°E

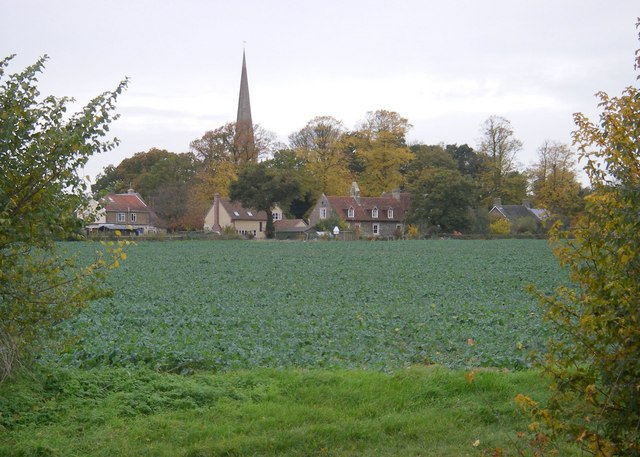
- St. James church, Greenstead Green

- Location within Essex
- Civil parish: Greenstead Green and Halstead Rural
- District: Braintree
- Shire county: Essex
- Region: East
- Country: England
- Sovereign state: United Kingdom
- Police: Essex
- Fire: Essex
- Ambulance: East of England

Greenstead Green is a village in the civil parish of Greenstead Green and Halstead Rural, near the town of Halstead, in the Braintree district, in the county of Essex, England.

Other nearby settlements include Burton's Green, Earls Colne, Plaistow Green and Tumbler's Green.
