= 1878 Maldon by-election =

UK Parliamentary by-election

The 1878 Maldon by-election was fought on 11 December 1878. The by-election was fought due to the resignation of the incumbent Conservative MP, George Sandford. It was won by the Liberal candidate George Courtauld.

1878 Maldon by-election
Party	Candidate	Votes	%	±%
Liberal	George Courtauld	671	55.9	+10.8
Conservative	William Abdy	530	44.1	−10.8
Majority		141	11.8	N/A
Turnout		1,201	78.3	+2.7
Registered electors		1,534		
Liberal gain from Conservative		Swing	+10.8	
