= Samuel Courtauld (industrialist) =

British businessman (1793-1881)

- Born: c.1793 Albany, New York, United States of America
- Died: 22 March 1881; Gosfield Hall, Halstead, Essex, United Kingdom of Great Britain and Ireland
- Organisation(s): Courtauld & Taylor (later, Courtaulds)
- Spouse: Ellen Courtauld
- Children: Louisa Ruth Lowe, née Harris
- Parents: George Courtauld; Ruth Courtauld, née Minton
- Family: Courtauld Family

Samuel Courtauld (c.1793–22 March 1881) was an American-born British industrialist who developed his family firm, Courtaulds, to become eventually the world's largest textile company.

== Family ==
Samuel Courtauld was the eldest son of George Courtauld, founder of George Courtauld and Co. The Courtauld family were descendants of Huguenot refugees who had settled in London and developed, over several generations, a highly regarded business as metalsmiths, working in both silver and gold.

Courtauld's father, a younger son, had made two innovations to the tradition. Firstly, George Courtauld founded a business in textiles rather than silverware and as this business is still a leading concern to this day, it is with textiles that most people associate the family. However, in the 18th century the family was as renowned for its silverware, as it would be in the 19th century for its silk and crepe and in the 20th century for its man-made textiles. The second change to tradition was that George Courtauld, baptised in the French Protestant church of the London Huguenots, would become a keen Unitarian. Samuel Courtauld would follow his father in both regards.

Samuel Courtauld adopted Louisa Ruth Lowe (née Harris) after her mother died of puerperal fever some eleven days after her birth. When he died in 1881, she inherited his Essex estate of Gosfield Hall and much of his fortune.

== Business ==
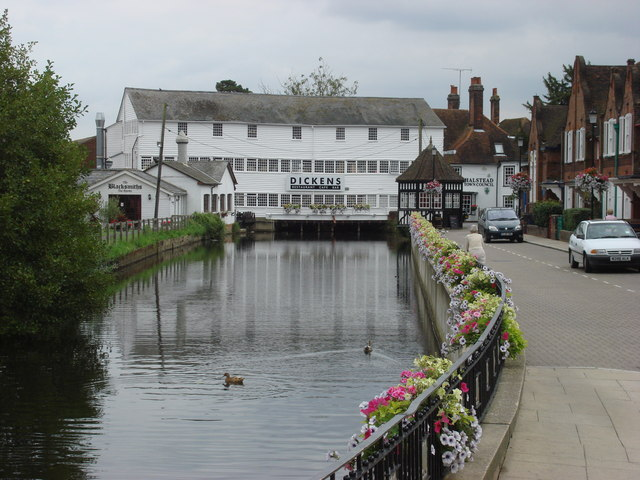
The Courtauld Silk Mill in Halstead, Essex

The Courtauld textile business was founded in 1794 in Pebmarsh in Essex. The business was originally "throwsters", that is producers of yarn, but later specialised in weaving as in silk and crepe fabrics. George Courtauld and his cousin Peter Taylor (1790–1850) developed the business over two decades, but faced difficulties in the lean years following the end of the Napoleonic Wars, when competition from the Continent was restored. In 1816, the father decided to retire from the business and hand over his share of the business to his son; it was to be the making of the firm.

After a couple of years getting to grips with the business and bringing it back to profitability, the new manager felt sufficiently confident to embark on a major programme of expansion and innovation. In 1818, Samuel Courtauld built two further mills, at Halstead and at Bocking. At the end of 1824 the Halstead Mill was sold to Stephen Beuzeville. In 1825, Samuel. installed a steam engine at the Bocking mill. An agreement dated 19 January 1825 was drawn up between Beuzeville and Samuel Courtauld and his partners for the conversion of the Halstead mill for silk throwing. Beuzeville was to provide the expertise, capital, and supply the silk; Courtauld was to erect the machinery power looms and operate the mill in return for a share in the profits; Beuzeville was to take delivery of the yarn and manufacture the crepe for which he was a technical expert of 20 years experience. The mill appears to have been in operation by the summer of 1825, with Joseph Ash as manager.

The introduction of new technology was important but the mills still remained heavily dependent on manpower, or more accurately, woman-power. The looms required supervision by an army of young female workers and even in 1838, more than 92% of the workforce was female.

In 1827 Stephen Beuzeville was declared bankrupt; a formal deed of sale dated 11 April 1828 was created between the commissioners in bankruptcy and Samuel Courtauld, whereby Halstead Mill (subject to charges of £300) was sold to Courtaulds for a cash payment of £1,500. Stephen and his father joined Courtaulds as employees. In 1828, Samuel brought his brother George Courtauld II (1802–1861) into the partnership and as the business developed, further partners were admitted. George Courtauld turned the company from being a relatively insignificant local family firm into a major player in the industry, with a national, or even international, reputation.

== Other interests ==
Courtauld used his growing economic power to support a range of political issues close to his heart. As an active supporter of the Whigs, he supported the momentous Reform Act 1832 and he also gave financial backing to the work of the Anti-Corn Law League. As an enthusiastic Unitarian, he was involved in the Nonconformist campaign against the paying of church rates to assist Anglican churches.

By 1850, Courtauld was, by any estimate, an extremely successful man, in business and finance, but his great wealth was unable to do much to alleviate his increasing deafness.

In 1854, Courtauld, now a man of some considerable fortune and standing in society, bought Gosfield Hall, a country house dating back to 1545, in the village of the same name, not far from Halstead. Courtauld devoted a great deal of time, effort and money to bring the house, and its large estate, to a standard suitable as the country seat of gentleman of means. The house is now a Grade I listed building but he would never fully enjoy the fruits of these labours as he was too firmly wedded to his business to contemplate retirement.

He continued to play an active role in the company until just before he died in March 1881.

== Legacy ==
The great riches generated by the success of the core textile business enabled later members of the family to pursue interests as patrons of the arts and philanthropists as well as in commerce. Notable members included Samuel Courtauld's great-nephews:

- Samuel Courtauld (1876–1947): became Chairman of Courtaulds in 1921, but today is probably better known as the founder of the Courtauld Institute of Art in London.
- Sir Stephen Courtauld MC (1883–1967), was also an arts patron and, like the earlier Samuel Courtauld, developed a talent for country house restoration. In 1933, began work on Eltham Palace in south-east London, where he and his wife lived until 1944.
