= George Courtauld (writer) =

- Born: George Courtauld; 8 July 1964 (age 62)
- Education: Sherborne School
- Occupations: City Headhunter, Author
- Writing career
- Notable work: The Pocket Book of Patriotism

George Courtauld (writer) is a city headhunter and British writer best known for his self-published title The Pocket Book of Patriotism (2004) which became a phenomenon when it sold 140,000 copies in its first two weeks and more than 400,000 in total.

The book - originally rejected by seven publishers - is a timeline with speeches and quotes he put together with his sons over a Christmas holiday. It reached number six in the non-fiction Christmas bestseller lists.

He went on to write The Pocket Book of Patriots (Random House 2005) and The Illustrated Book of Patriotism (Ebury Press 2006), England’s Best Loved Poems/ The Enchantment of England (Ebury Press 2007) and The Glorious Book of Great British Weapons (Penguin 2008) .

Since then Courtauld has written The Pocket Book of What When and Who on Earth (2011) published by Bene Factum and Three Men on a Diet (2018) published by Constable, an imprint of Little Brown.

Courtauld was educated at Sherborne School and Pembroke College, Cambridge from where he joined merchant bank Kleinwort Benson in 1986 before moving into executive recruitment in 1992. He lives with his wife Fiona in Essex. They have three grown up sons.
