= Gosfield =

Village in Essex, England

Coordinates: 51°56′N 0°35′E

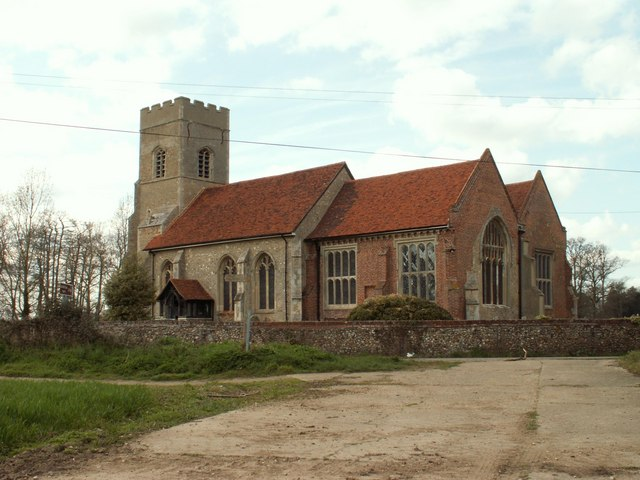
- St. Catharine's Church, Gosfield

- Location within Essex
- Population: 1,453 (Parish, 2021)
- Civil parish: Gosfield
- District: Braintree
- Shire county: Essex
- Region: East
- Country: England
- Sovereign state: United Kingdom
- Post town: HALSTEAD
- Postcode district: CO9
- Dialling code: 01787
- Police: Essex
- Fire: Essex
- Ambulance: East of England
- UK Parliament: Braintree

Gosfield is a village and civil parish in the Braintree district of Essex, England. It is located around 2 miles (3 km) west of Halstead, its post town. At the 2021 census the parish had a population of 1,453.

Places of note include the following:

- Gosfield Hall: a country house and Grade I listed building, dating back to 1545.
- Gosfield School: an independent school.
- Gosfield Sandpits, a Local Nature Reserve.

== History ==
Gosfield does not appear to have enjoyed either a long or distinguished history. It did not warrant its own entry in the Domesday Book of 1086 (an omission that does not necessarily mean that there was no settlement in the parish in the 11th century). In addition the listed building description for the parish church, the Church of St Catherine, suggests that the present structure is not earlier in date than the 15th century. Nevertheless, the village does have a history.

=== Prehistoric & Roman ===
The parish certainly did witness human activity well before the 11th century AD. The Historic Environment Record (HER) for Essex records several cropmark features in the civil parish that are almost certainly prehistoric. These include a circular monument some 30 metres in diameter that may have been either a late Neolithic henge, or more likely, a Bronze Age round barrow. Without excavation it is not possible to say what exactly the cropmark indicates.

The HER also records that the Roman road that linked Colchester (Camulodunum) the capital of the Trinivantes, the original capital of the Roman province of Britannia, and the site of a legionary fortress, with Caistor St Edmonds (Venta Icenorum) the capital of the Iceni, runs through the village. Part of this Roman road is followed by the village's main road.

=== Medieval ===
The HER also indicates that early medieval (the period between the end of Roman rule and the Norman Conquest) metalwork has been discovered in the parish. This does not necessarily mean that Gosfield was a settlement during this period, only that the area was used in some capacity before the Norman Conquest. The majority of these finds may be associated with hunting. This ties in with the placename evidence, as the 'field' element of the name suggests that the settlement originated as an area of cultivated land within an area of woodland or heath.

The Victoria County History (VCH) entry for Hedingham Priory states that a charter of 1191 the Earl of Oxford granted a wood in Gosfield to the priory. This may be the earliest documentary mention of Gosfield. It suggests that Gosfield may have come into the possession of the De Vere family not long after the Norman Conquest. An Aubrey De Vere appears to have been one of William the Conqueror's supporters who accompanied him from France in 1066. His grandson, another Aubrey, was appointed as the first Earl of Oxford. The first Earl and his wife, Lucy, founded Hedingham Priory in the second half of the 12th century, and endowed it with a portion of their extensive holdings.

The VCH also tells us that Philip Morant, the clergyman who published a history of Essex in the mid 18th century, reported that at least one holding of arable land in Gosfield is mentioned among the priory's holdings in the 13th century. Morant also be says that the priory held a church at Gosfield, together with a vicarage, at that time. If Morant can be relied upon, which is far from certain as the document that Morant cites could not be traced by later historians, this suggests that Gosfield parish church may well have earlier origins than is suggested by the listed building description.

=== Post Medieval ===
Gosfield Hall and the parish church both lie to the west of the modern village. The hall is believed to have been built by Sir John Wentworth in 1545. John Wentworth seems to have been the son of a Yorkshire family who took a prominent role in the staff of Cardinal Wolsey under Henry VIII. He survived Wolsey's fall from grace and continued to hold office at Court into the reign of Elizabeth I. Wentworth might not, however, have built a completely new house. The present hall is built around a courtyard, and histories of the hall speak of the landscaping of the deerpark in the 18th century. Both of these facts hint that the hall might have been erected on the site of a medieval hunting lodge. There is, however, no firm evidence for this suggestion.

The hall appears to have undergone occasional remodelling after coming into the possession of wealthy families, followed by periods of lengthy decline as either the money ran out or the family moved elsewhere. The Wentworth line ended with Sir John Wentworth, 1st Baronet, who died in 1631, having wasted the "splendid inheritance" left to him by his father John Wentworth. By 1691 the Hall had come into the possession of Sir Thomas Millington, physician to the joint monarchs, William III and Mary II. Millington is credited with the reconstruction of the Grand Salon and with building guest quarters above it. By 1715 the Hall was the property of the leading politician, John Knight. Knight is believed to have had the east façade remodelled. After Knight's death the Hall came into the hands of the Earl Nugent, another prominent politician, who had married Knight's daughter. Nugent added a ballroom to the Hall and had the deerpark landscaped. On Nugent's death the Hall came into the ownership of George Grenville-Temple, Marquis of Buckingham. Buckingham had married Nugent's daughter, however, he preferred to make his ancestral seat, Stowe, his primary residence. As a result, the Hall fell out of favour for many decades.

One effect of the hall's fall from favour was that it briefly became the home of the exiled Louis XVIII of France in the years 1807 to 1809.

In 1791 Louis, the brother of King Louis XVI fled to the Low Countries, as the Revolution turned more violent and hostile to the Monarchy. He was to spend the next 23 years in exile, during which time his brother was guillotined, and his nephew, who nominally became Louis XVII on his father's execution, died in prison.

Louis had to flee the Low Countries in the face of advancing French armies. He fled to Italy, from where another French invasion forced him to flee again. Louis sought refuge in Brunswick, in Germany. In Brunswick he had to live in modest circumstances. Following his nephew's death, however, he nominally became King of France, and sought a lifestyle more fitting to his status. At first many European monarchs were willing to offer him shelter and enable him to establish a court in exile. However, the extravagance of his court and his intrigues aimed at restoring the French Monarchy made him a difficult guest. He was welcomed to Russia by the Tsar in 1798, but was banished from Russia in 1801. He then moved to Warsaw, which was under Prussian control. He lived in Warsaw until 1804, when he was expelled by the Prussian King. A new Tsar invited him back to Russia. By this time, however, French armies under Napoleon dominated continental Europe, and French agents were believed to be active across the continent. As a result, in 1807 the Tsar informed Louis that he could no longer guarantee his safety. This forced Louis to set sail for London. Unfortunately for Louis, his arrival in Britain seems to have been rather an embarrassment, and he was not welcomed with open arms. Eventually the Marquis of Buckingham offered him the lease of Gosfield Hall. However, the Hall soon proved inadequate for Louis and his extensive but impoverished court. So after around two years Louis departed to Hartwell House in Buckinghamshire.

The Hall now seems to have entered a lengthy period of neglect during which it seems to have been leased to a series of tenants, and in all probability maintenance of the Hall and its estate was overlooked. It was only the purchase of the Hall in 1854 by Samuel Courtald that ended this period of decline.

Samuel Courtauld had inherited a textile business from his father, George. In the late 18th century, George Courtauld set-up a water-powered silk mill at Pebmarsh, near Halstead. When the business ran into difficulties in 1816 George passed the management of the firm to his eldest son, Samuel. Over the next couple of decades Samuel set about modernising and expanding the company. He purchase watermills at Braintree, Bocking and Halstead and converted them for textile production. It appears that lack of capital restricted Samuel's ambitions. In the early years he frequently had to enter partnerships, often with his younger brothers, in order to raise finance. From time to time he also had to lease, or even sell, one or other of the company's mills. Nevertheless, the business survived and finally flourished. Samuel eventually regained control of the mills at Braintree, Bocking and Halstead, and by 1850 the firm employed over 2,000 people in its three mills.

One of the keys to this eventual success appears to have been the decision to diversify from the throwing of silk thread to the manufacture of crepe fabric. It is not entirely clear when this occurred, but it was extremely fortunate, as crepe became fashionable, and became even more so following Prince Albert's death in 1861. Following her husband's death, on the rare occasions that she appeared in public, Queen Victoria was always seen wearing black crepe. By the time Samuel purchased Gosfield Hall he was a wealthy man. In the following decades he became even more wealthy. So he had the resources to restore and modernise the Hall.

The hall was not the only feature of the village that Samuel Courtauld changed after moving to the village. He built new homes for many of those who worked on the estate. These can be found on the eastern side of the main road through the village, in the form of pairs of semi-detached cottages called Park Cottages. Courtauld also paid for the erection of the Reading and Coffee Rooms at the southern end of Park Cottages, and a new village school on the western side of the main road. Courtauld's motives may not have been entirely altruistic. The school was almost certainly built as a result of the movement to make education compulsory; a movement which resulted in the Elementary Education Act 1870 which made education up to the age of 13 compulsory. The school, the Reading and Coffee Rooms and Park Cottages lie well to the east of the hall, screened off from the hall by a belt of trees. It is likely that, before Park Cottages were built, many of the estate workers lived along Church Lane, close to the parish church and within sight of the hall, so by building these new homes and facilities he also improved the view from the south side of the hall.

Samuel had no offspring of his own. So on his death in 1881, he left the hall and much of his fortune to an adopted daughter, Louisa Lowe (née Harris). At the time Louisa Lowe was married to Arthur Lowe, a captain in British army. Several years after her first husband's death, in 1888, Louisa married Thomas Taylor, a surgeon. Louisa continued to live in the Hall until she was well into her 90s. It is quite likely that in Louisa's later years the Hall had again fallen into decline.

During the Second World War the hall was commandeered by the military. After the war, the hall and its park have had a variety of uses, including a school, a golfing venue and an old people's home. It is now (2020) run as a wedding venue.

During the post-medieval period Gosfield seems to have remained an agricultural village. Farming, along with the hall and the parish church, probably dominated life. The number of listed buildings in the village described as having their origins between the 15th and 17th centuries suggests that Gosfield enjoyed a degree of prosperity during these centuries that it never achieved again until the 20th century. It seems likely that this prosperity was associated with it lying on a route between the wealthy textile-producing region in Suffolk and Norfolk and its main market in London.

== See also ==
- List of civil parishes in Essex
