= Courtaulds =

British textile company

- Industry: Textiles, Chemicals
- Founded: 1794; 232 years ago
- Founder: George Courtauld
- Defunct: 2000 / 2006
- Fate: Acquired
- Successor: Sara Lee, Akzo Nobel
- Headquarters: Coventry
- Key people: George Courtauld; Samuel Courtauld
- Products: Textiles, Chemicals
- Number of employees: 1000 (2006)
- Website: www.akzonobel.com

Courtaulds was a United Kingdom-based manufacturer of fabric, clothing, artificial fibres, and chemicals. At one point, it was the world's leading man-made fibre production company before being broken up in 1990 into Courtaulds plc and Courtaulds Textiles Ltd.

The company was established in 1794 as George Courtauld & Co by George Courtauld. By 1850, it employed over 2,000 people across three silk mill, and it continued to expand over time. In 1904, Courtaulds acquired the Cross and Bevan's patents to the viscose process for manufacturing artificial silk to reduce the company's dependence on natural silk; within the decade, it was producing man-made fibres in quantity. Courtaulds also entered the market of cellulosics (viscose and acetate) in North America with the setting up of the American Viscose Corporation (AVC) in 1909. During the interwar period, the firm expanded its cellulosics business through various means, which included the founding of British Cellophane in 1935. By the end of the Second World War, Courtaulds was one of the four groups which dominated the man-made fibre industry in Europe.

Courtaulds was one of the first British companies to setup an economics department, a decision that has been credited with helping the firm become the world's largest textile manufacturer. In 1962, it was subject to an unsuccessful hostile takeover attempt by Imperial Chemical Industries (ICI). In the 1980s, Courtaulds worked on developing solvent-spun cellulose fibres. By the late 1980s, intense competition from Asian competitors led to the textiles business producing a smaller share of the profits in contrast to its fibre and chemicals business. Accordingly, in 1990, Courtaulds demerged itself into two parts, Courtaulds plc (containing the fibre production and chemicals activities) and Courtaulds Textiles Ltd (focused on fabric manufacture and clothing). Courtaulds plc would merge with competitor Akzo Nobel in 1998 while Sara Lee acquired Courtaulds Textiles two years later.

== History ==
=== Foundation ===
The company was founded by George Courtauld in 1794, and later joined by his cousin, Peter Taylor (1790–1850), as a silk, crepe, and textile business at Pebmarsh in north Essex, trading as George Courtauld & Co. By 1810, his American-born son Samuel Courtauld was managing his own silk mill in Braintree, Essex.

In 1818, George Courtauld returned to America, leaving his son, Samuel, and nephew, Peter, to expand the business, now known as Courtauld & Taylor, by building further mills in Halstead and Bocking. In 1825, Sam Courtauld installed a steam engine at the Bocking mill, and then installed power looms at Halstead. His mills, however, remained heavily dependent on young female workers – in 1838, over 92% of his workforce was female.

By 1850, the company employed over 2,000 people at three silk mills, and Sam had recruited partners including (in 1828) his brother, George Courtauld II (1802–1861) and (in 1849) fellow Unitarian and Social Reformer Peter Alfred Taylor (1819-1891 – son of Peter Taylor who died the following year). By this time, Courtauld was a wealthy man but was also suffering from deafness. He had planned to spend more time on his country estate Gosfield Hall near Halstead, but continued to play an active role in the company until just before he died in March 1881.

His great-nephew Samuel Courtauld (1876–1947) became chairman of the Courtauld company in 1921 but is chiefly remembered today as the founder of the Courtauld Institute of Art in London. William Julien Courtauld was also a benefactor of the arts: he gave artworks to the Essex County Council chamber at Chelmsford and the town hall at Braintree in the 1930s.

=== Expansion ===
Wishing to reduce their dependence on natural silk, in 1904, Courtaulds acquired the Cross and Bevan's patents to the viscose process for manufacturing artificial silk or rayon from dissolving pulp. They set up the first factory to produce it in Coventry UK in 1905. The early yarns were first woven into fabrics at the Halstead Mill in Essex in March 1906, but the process remained troublesome until further inventions improved yarn strength. However, in a few years the process became highly successful and was responsible for transforming the silk weaver into the world's leading man-made fibre production company.

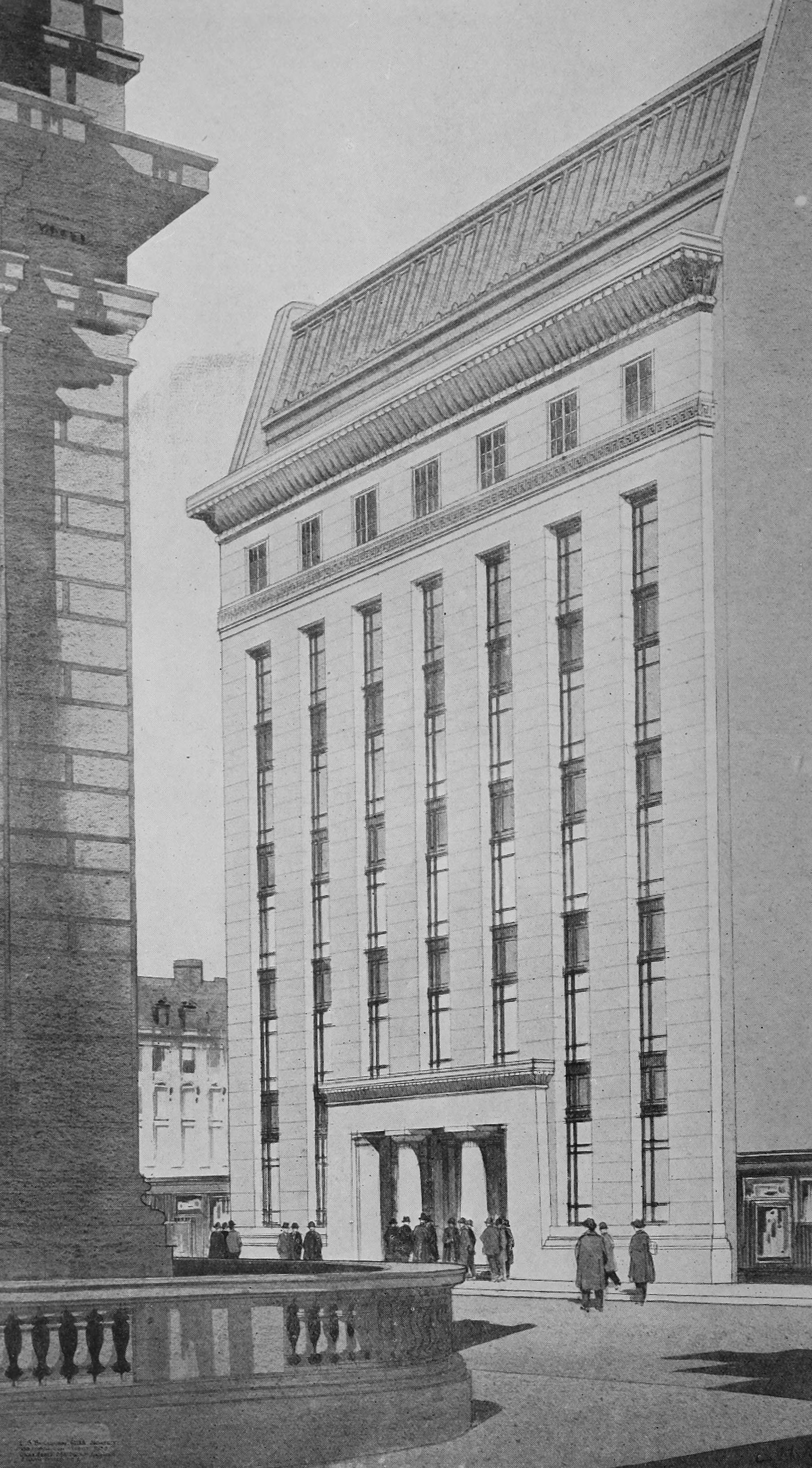
The company's 1925 building at 16 St Martin's Le Grand in London, designed by Leo S. Sullivan

Courtaulds also entered the market of cellulosics (viscose and acetate) in North America with the setting up of the American Viscose Corporation (AVC) in 1909. The investment in the US was highly successful, but its sale at a knock-down price was enforced in 1941 as part of the negotiations which preceded Lend-Lease. Courtaulds was Canada's only rayon manufacturer in the 1980s, and was criticised for polluting Cornwall, Ontario. By 1989, the company was dumping "an average of 12 million litres of water a day, loaded with acids, zinc, murky solid materials and other contaminants.... Tests in 1986 showed the company's waste killed healthy trout within five minutes."

In the interwar period, Courtaulds, along with its domestic rival, British Celanese, both benefitted from tariff protection extended to the rayon industry by the Finance Act of 1925. In 1927–28, Courtaulds and Vereinigte Glanzstoff-Fabriken (VGF) gained control of the Italian rayon manufacturer SNIA Viscosa from Riccardo Gualino. A German director of VGF, Karl Scherer, replaced Gualino as head of the firm and cut output drastically. The foreign intervention was seen as humiliating by the fascists. In Europe, Courtaulds expanded its cellulosics business both directly and through joint ventures, such as the creation of British Cellophane in 1935.

In 1945, Courtaulds remained one of the four groups which dominated the man-made fibre industry in Europe (counting the German VGF and the Dutch AKU as one group, and including also the CTA—later merged into Rhone Poulenc in France, and Snia Viscose in Italy). Courtaulds' activities in continental Europe consisted in a wholly owned, one-factory viscose fibre business employing some 3,000 people in France, a 50% share in a similar business in Germany (of which the other 50% was owned by VGF, the major competitor), and a minority shareholding which controlled 20% of the voting capital in the Italian firm Snia Viscosa, also primarily a viscose fibre producer. This activity expanded until the 1960s, when these products were replaced by newer developments.

In 1964, Courtaulds acquired Fine Spinners and Doublers for £14 million and the Lancashire Cotton Corporation for £22 million.

=== Postwar era ===
Carbon disulphide, used in rayon production, increases the risk of heart attacks and strokes in rayon workers (among other health risks, some of them known since the 1800s). Data on these additional risks came out in the 1960s. Courtaulds worked hard to prevent publication of this data in the UK.

Courtaulds was one of the earliest companies in the UK to establish an economics department. In the three decades following the Second World War, this department made notable contributions to the understanding of investment appraisal and the formulation of British, and later European, trade policy. The function also played a significant role in the development of Courtaulds from a rather sedate, man-made fibres producer to the world's largest textile manufacturer, a position the company attained in the mid-1970s. The economics department then influenced the early stages of the subsequent extensive restructuring of the company, a process that culminated in the demerging of its textile activities as a separately quoted company in March 1990.

In 1962, a hostile takeover attempt of Courtaulds was launched by Imperial Chemical Industries (ICI); the board chose to fight this effort, enacting measures such as a more open management approach and promising shareholders a 30 percent rise in pre-tax earnings. ICI's takeover bid ultimately failed, an outcome which somewhat tarnished the image of ICI chairman Paul Chambers.

Throughout the 1980s, Courtaulds conducted research on solvent-spun cellulose fibres, using amine oxides. This process had previously been suggested by Eastman-Kodak, but their patent was nearing expiration. By the 1990s, this research led to pilot scale facilities and a subsequent patent battle with Lenzing. The two companies struck a cross-licensing agreement; ultimately, the Lyocell process came into Lenzing's ownership following the demise of Courtaulds plc in 1998.

=== Breakup ===
By the late 1980s, the manufacture of clothing was quickly moving to South East Asia and China. Courtaulds had closed many of its UK factories and moved production to new Asian sites. Further, its main profit was coming from its fibre and chemicals businesses, which were being held back by the textiles business.

In March 1990, Courtaulds demerged itself into two parts, Courtaulds plc (containing the fibre manufacture and chemicals businesses) and Courtaulds Textiles Ltd (the yarn and fabric manufacture and clothing businesses).

=== Courtaulds plc ===
In 1990, the company began pilot production of Tencel, a brand of lyocell rayon. The production of lyocell does not use carbon disulfide, but is more expensive than viscose rayon. In January 1993, the Tencel plant in Mobile, Alabama, US reached full production levels of 20,000 tons per year, by which time Courtaulds had spent £100 million and 10 years on Tencel development. Tencel revenues for 1993 were estimated as likely to be £50 million.

In 1991, the company closed a viscose plant in Calais, France, allowing its other plants to boost output to 93% capacity, compared with an industry average of 75%. The share price doubled in the first three years following the demerger. CEO Sipko Huismans had focused the company on rationalisation and cost cutting, saying "We have to cut costs. We can't count on sales growth to pay us more or to allow us to buy more of our favorite things."

In 1993, the company employed 23,000 and had £2 billion in annual revenue, with 30% of revenue from the United States and 40% from Europe.

During the late 1990s, Courtaulds plc sought to merge with competitor Akzo Nobel, which the European Commission conditionally approved of (subject to the sale of Courtauld's aerospace business). Accordingly, in June 1998, it merged with Akzo Nobel; as a consequence, use of the "Courtaulds" name by the newly combined entity was discontinued shortly thereafter.

Reorganisation of the former assets of Courtaulds plc was undertaken by Akzo Nobel; firstly, it combined the Tencel division with other fibre divisions under the Acordis banner, then sold them off to the private equity firm CVC Capital Partners. In 2000, CVC sold the Tencel division to Lenzing AG, who combined it with their "Lenzing Lyocell" business, but maintained the brand name Tencel. At this time "Tencel" production was at 80,000 tonnes per year.

In September 2000, Courtaulds Fibers Inc. was found guilty of negligence for polluting the environment outside its plant in Axis, Alabama, US with carbon disulfide. 1991 emissions were more than double those of the nine other plants in Alabama combined, and made minimal improvements to abide by the 1990 amendments to the United States' Clean Air Act. In Europe, Courtaulds had taken much more stringent emissions-reduction measures.

==== Courtaulds Aerospace ====
In October 2000, PPG Industries announced it had agreed to buy Courtaulds Aerospace for $US512.5 million. Based in Glendale, California, US the aerospace business has annual sales of approximately $US240 million, employs 1,200 people. In the US it manufactures sealants in Glendale, California, US and Shildon, England; coatings and sealants in Mojave, California, US; glazing sealants at Gloucester City, New Jersey, US; and also coatings at Gonfreville, France. The business also operates 14 application-support centres in North America, Europe, Africa, Asia and Australia.

=== Courtaulds Textiles ===
After its demerger, Courtaulds Textiles sold off its retail businesses and the Contessa lingerie chain and McIlroys had been sold by 1995.

In 2000, the American consumer goods company Sara Lee acquired Courtaulds Textiles for £150 million in a hostile takeover. Courtaulds Textile continued to operate as its own distinct entity, although as a division of Sara Lee, unlike the chemical merger which saw Courtaulds disappear into Akzo Nobel.

In the early 2000s, many jobs and factories were eliminated, especially in the UK, where manufacturing costs were higher. Marks and Spencer was squeezing its suppliers for lower costs. In 2007, 40% of Courtauld's turnover was from sales to Marks & Spencer, although sales had declined rapidly as of 2006.

In February 2005, Brenda Barns became the chairman and CEO of Sara Lee, and tried to sell the Courtaulds Textile division.

In April 2006, the UK pension regulator required Sara Lee to increase payments into Courtaulds' $483 million (£260 million) pension deficit from £20m to £32m per year until 2015. One month later, Sara Lee sold Courtaulds Textiles for an undisclosed sum, but retained its pension debt. The company was bought by a consortium led by PD Enterprise Limited, a private company based in Hong Kong. At the time, Courtaulds had about a thousand employees in the UK, of whom 300 were employed at a tights factory. Sara Lee conceded that it had effectively "given away" the unit.

In 2007, Courtaulds Textiles employed around 20,000 people across 16 countries in Europe, North America and Asia. One joint venture was Slimline (Pvt) Ltd, Sri Lanka's largest apparel manufacturer, employing 1450 people and with a turnover of £25 million, and Courtaulds Clothing Lanka, which employed 700 people to make men's underwear. The whole company had an annual turnover exceeding £1billion.

== Brands ==
- Aristoc – hosiery
- Berlei – lingerie and activewear
- Elbeo – hosiery
- Gossard – lingerie
- Pretty Polly – hosiery, lingerie and activewear

== Production sites ==
- Flintshire – A subsidiary of a German company, the British Glanzstoff Manufacturing Company started an artificial silk factory in Flint in 1907. During World War I the factory closed down but was taken over by Courtaulds in 1917. In 1913, the company had started making the synthetic fibre viscose rayon, made from cellulose derived from imported wood pulp or cotton waste. Courtaulds in September 1919 bought the old Muspratt Alkali factory in Flint from United Alkali Co Ltd and called it Castle Works, where after conversion they started production in 1922 of manufactured viscose rayon yarn. Courtaulds also in December 1927 bought the Holywell Textile Mill in Flint which they called Deeside Mill and after reconstruction and alterations was used for yarn processing. At its height Courtaulds employed over 10,000 people at four sites. At Greenfield, some 5 miles (8.0 km) further down the Dee estuary, two additional large rayon production facilities existed from 1936 onwards, named Number 1 and Number 2. These mills employed over 3,000 people. Textile production declined from 1950, and Aber works shut initially in 1957, opened for rayon in 1966, and pulled down in 1984. Castle works closed in 1977 and Deeside Mill in 1989. The number 1 facility at Greenfield was mothballed in 1978, and the entire site was decommissioned in the mid-1980s.
- Chorley, Lancashire – Talbot Mill on the eastern periphery of the town was built in 1908 and consisted of separate spinning and weaving divisions. The spinning division of the mill was managed by Courtaulds from the early 1970s and closed in 1989.
- Preston – A large rayon production facility, called the Red Scar mill, existed in Preston. The main product was tyre cord. It employed around 4,000 people. It was decommissioned in 1980.
- Northern Ireland – A rayon facility existed in Carrickfergus, which was designed specifically to make a fibre suitable for the Irish linen industry. Many of the latterly held British-based jobs were based in the grant-aided infrastructure of Northern Ireland. Limavady employed 185 jobs, which were lost in May 2004.
- Wolverhampton – Dunstall Hall Works – Rayon facility.
- Coventry – Foleshill Road Works:
  - Courtaulds Research – Developed Courtelle, Vincel, Evlan, Viloft, Galaxy, Kesp, synthetic tobacco, Tencel, lyocell, Hydrocel, Alginate.
  - Courtaulds Grafil – Production of carbon fibre for use in sports, aerospace and automotive industries.
  - National Plastics – Production of specialised plastic products including British military bulletproof helmets; acquired in 1978 the Southend-based plastic moulding manufacturer Ekco Plastics.
  - Courtaulds Engineering – Design of plant, production of spinnerets.
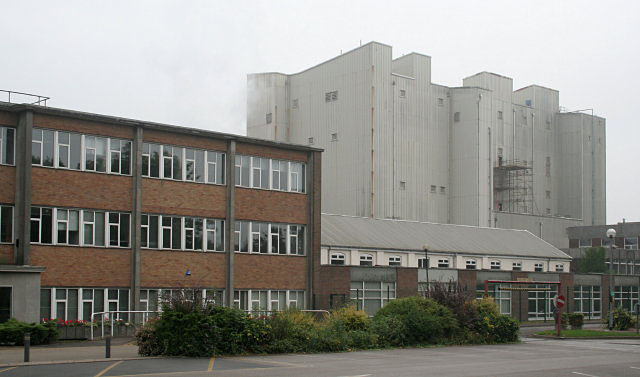
- Courtaulds Factory at Spondon in Derbyshire
  Derby – Spondon Works – Acetate fibre, water-soluble polymers.
- Grimsby – The Grimsby 'Fibro' plant was built on the bank of the Humber West of Grimsby between 1952 and 1957 to produce viscose rayon staple fibre, known as Fibro. In 1959 a new 'Courtelle' factory was constructed to make a proprietary acrylic fibre. Both factories were substantially expanded in the 1960s and 1970s. Later the advanced form of rayon known as Tencel fibre was manufactured using a more environmentally friendly process. Acrylic dope for 'Grafil' carbon fibre was also manufactured. The site was sold in 1998 to Accordis UK Ltd; the Tencel plant sold to the Lenzing Group, while the acrylic fibre plant went through a number of administrations in the 2000s, with production ceasing 2013.
- Trafford Park – Manufacture of carbon disulphide, base of Cowburn & Cowpar (chemical transport).
- Worksop – Formerly known as "Bairnswear", the 36,000 m^{2}, 205.72 m × 175 m factory first opened its doors in 1953 as Bairnswear knitwear. The site was a relativity modern mid-20th century mill which was located on Raymoth Lane and it employed over 1000 employees (1950s–1970s). In the early 1960s it was rebranded as Courtaulds when Bairnswear hit financial difficulty. Princess Diana visited the site in 1989; on the same trip she visited to open the new Bassetlaw Hospital. Rumours of the site's closure circulated throughout the 1980s and 1990s and this happened in 2000. A small factory shop stayed open for another year selling all its goods off cheaply. During the early 2000s after the mill had ceased production the factory was still in good condition and a buyer was sought. The site deteriorated for three years until Westbury Homes bought it for residential redevelopment in July 2003. In spite of local objections including the MP John Mann to keep the 9-acre site to form another industry, planning permission was granted, asbestos was stripped and the factory demolished in September 2003 – January 2004, and the site has since been redeveloped into residential housing.
- Middlesbrough – Started as factory then moved solely to warehousing and distribution closed July 2010.
- Somerset (Bridgwater) British Cellophane was set up in the early 20th century to produce Cellophane, a cellulose based clear packaging. Production finally ceased in the early 1990s and the site is now to be used for housing for a new power station.
- Courtaulds and its many subsidiaries had many other production sites not listed above.
