= George Courtauld (industrialist, born 1761) =

English silk weaver (1761–1823)

- Born: September 19, 1761; Cornhill, City of London, Kingdom of Great Britain
- Died: August 12, 1823 (aged 61); Allegheny County, Pennsylvania, United States
- Burial place: Allegheny Cemetery, Pittsburgh, Pennsylvania, United States
- Occupations: Industrialist; silk weaver
- Known for: Founder of George Courtauld & Co (later, Courtaulds)
- Spouse(s): Ruth Courtauld, née Minton
- Children: Samuel Courtauld; Catherine Courtauld; George Courtauld
- Parents: Samuel Courtauld, I; Louisa Courtauld, née Ogier
- Family: Courtauld Family

George Courtauld (1761–1823) was a British silk weaver, industrialist and founder of George Courtauld & Co (later, Courtaulds).

== Early life ==
George Courtauld was born on the 19 September 1761 in Cornhill, to Louisa Courtauld, née Ogier, and Samuel Courtauld, I. A member of the Huguenot community in London, Courtauld was baptised on the 8 October 1761 at the French Church on Threadneedle Street.

== Career ==
Apprenticed to a Spitalfields silk weaver in 1775, George Courtauld first worked on his own as silk throwster. Between 1785 and 1794 he made a number of visits to America. In 1794 he established his own textile business at Pebmarsh under the name George Courtald & Co., which was to become the UK's largest manufacturer of mourning crape. However by 1816 the business was in financial difficulty: that year George's son Samuel took over the business and built it into the UK's largest manufacturer of mourning crape.

Courtauld was an ardent Unitarian, and retired to the United States.

Courtauld is buried at Allegheny Cemetery in Pittsburgh.

== Family ==
George Courtauld married Ruth Minton on 10 July 1789. Their children were:

- Samuel Courtauld (1793–1881)
- Catherine Courtauld (1795-)
- George Courtauld (1802–1861)
