= Pebmarsh =

Village in Essex, England

Coordinates: 51.968279°N 0.6954°E

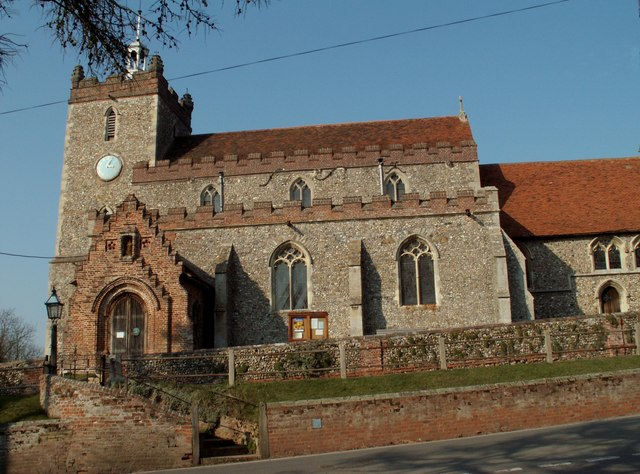
- St. John the Baptist church, Pebmarsh

- Location within Essex
- Population: 531 (Parish, 2021)
- OS grid reference: TL855335
- Civil parish: Pebmarsh
- District: Braintree
- Shire county: Essex
- Region: East
- Country: England
- Sovereign state: United Kingdom
- Post town: Halstead
- Postcode district: CO9
- Dialling code: 01787
- Police: Essex
- Fire: Essex
- Ambulance: East of England
- UK Parliament: Braintree
- Website: pebmarsh.com

Pebmarsh is a small village and a civil parish in the Braintree District, in Essex, England. It is situated to the north east of Halstead close to the A131. At the 2021 census the parish had a population of 531.

A plaque on the church indicates the settlement of Pebmarsh was recorded, in some form, in the Domesday Book of 1086.

== Amenities ==
It has a small village school, St. John the Baptist C of E primary school. There has been a school in Pebmarsh since the late 18th century, however the main part of the present school has been open and in operation since 1967, serving the surrounding villages of Pebmarsh, Lamarsh and Alphamstone. Pebmarsh has a large village hall which was built fairly recently to replace its run-down predecessor. There is a children's park in the vicinity, as well as a small skate park with three ramps.

The pub in the village, The King's Head, is community-owned and operated by a tenant landlord. £350,000 was raised from over 320 local shareholders after the previous owners retired. This was in response to the pub, the social centre of the village, not remaining open for more than a few years at a time.

Towards Cross End at the north eastern end of the village, further amenities exist including a small shop affiliated to Londis, a hairdressers, and a restaurant.

The closest rail station is at Bures, just over 3 miles away.

== Walking ==
Pebmarsh provides ample opportunity for walking through the beautiful English countryside. There are many public footpaths, for example one that leads to another village close by, Colne Engaine.

== River ==
A river runs straight through the centre of the village, called the River Peb, and is where the name of the village 'Pebmarsh' comes from.

== Notable people ==
- George Courtauld set-up a water-powered silk mill at Pebmarsh in the late 18th century.
- Edward Grimston, politician, died here in 1881.
- Mary and Geraldine Peppin, twin sister piano duo, lived here from the 1960s until their death is the 1980s, Mary at 'Great Lengths' and Geraldine at 'Mount Pleasant'.
- Sir Ronald Storrs, an official in the British Foreign and Colonial Office, Governor of Jerusalem, and a colleague of Lawrence of Arabia, is buried in the village churchyard.
