= Halstead =

Town in the Braintree district of Essex, England

Coordinates: 51.9451°N 0.6411°E

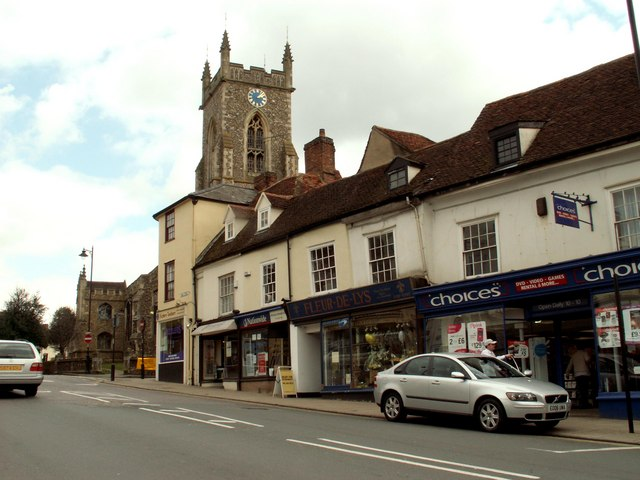
- St Andrew's Church and Halstead High Street

- Location within Essex
- Population: 13,529 (Parish, 2021)
- OS grid reference: TL816306
- Civil parish: Halstead
- District: Braintree
- Shire county: Essex
- Region: East
- Country: England
- Sovereign state: United Kingdom
- Post town: HALSTEAD
- Postcode district: CO9
- Dialling code: 01787
- Police: Essex
- Fire: Essex
- Ambulance: East of England
- UK Parliament: Braintree

Halstead is a town and civil parish in the Braintree district of Essex, England. It lies on the River Colne, 6 miles (10 km) north-east of Braintree and 12 miles (19 km) north-west of Colchester. At the 2021 census the parish had a population of 13,529. It is twinned with Haubourdin in the Nord department of France.

== History ==
Halstead is an ancient community that developed initially on the hill to the north of the River Colne. Archaeological evidence indicates that Halstead has been occupied since the early Bronze Age. The sites of Iron Age and Roman settlements, including a villa, were discovered in the vicinity of Greenstead Hall, where Saxon pottery was also found. A Romano-British villa also lies in a field to the south of the River Colne at Blue Bridge, indicating early settlement in the fertile river valley. The name Halstead derives from the Old English gehæld / hald (refuge, shelter, healthy) and stede (site, place or farm), meaning "healthy farm" or "place of refuge". After the Norman Conquest, in the Middle English of the 11th century, hald was written and spoken as halt, holt, or holð. Halstead is recorded in the Domesday Book of 1086 as Haltesteda and thrice as Halsteda in the Hundred of Hinckford, where it was mainly held by many freemen as feu in 1066, at the time of King Edward. In 1086, Halstead was one of the largest 20% of settlements recorded in Domesday, and had four owners. Most of the manor of Halstead had been granted by King William to William de Warenne as tenant-in-chief and lord of most of its wealth, and about one-third of the manor of Halstead was possessed by Richard, son of count Gilbert as tenant-in-chief.

In the Rebellion of 1088, William de Warenne took the winning side of William Rufus and was named Earl of Surrey, while Richard supported Robert Curthose which led to retirement at a monastery and transfer of his portion of Halstead to his son Gilbert fitz Richard.

There was evidence of a market in Halstead before 1251 when a royal charter was granted for a weekly market and an annual fair. Further grants were made in 1330 and 1467 for the market which was then held in Chipping Hill. St Andrew's Church was in existence by 1276 and the town developed around the Church and nearby market.

In about 1413 Holy Trinity Chapel was erected near the junction of the present Chapel Hill with Trinity Street and Mount Hill. This chapel disappeared by the 18th century and during 1843 it was replaced by Holy Trinity Church, a Gothic Revival building.

== Area ==
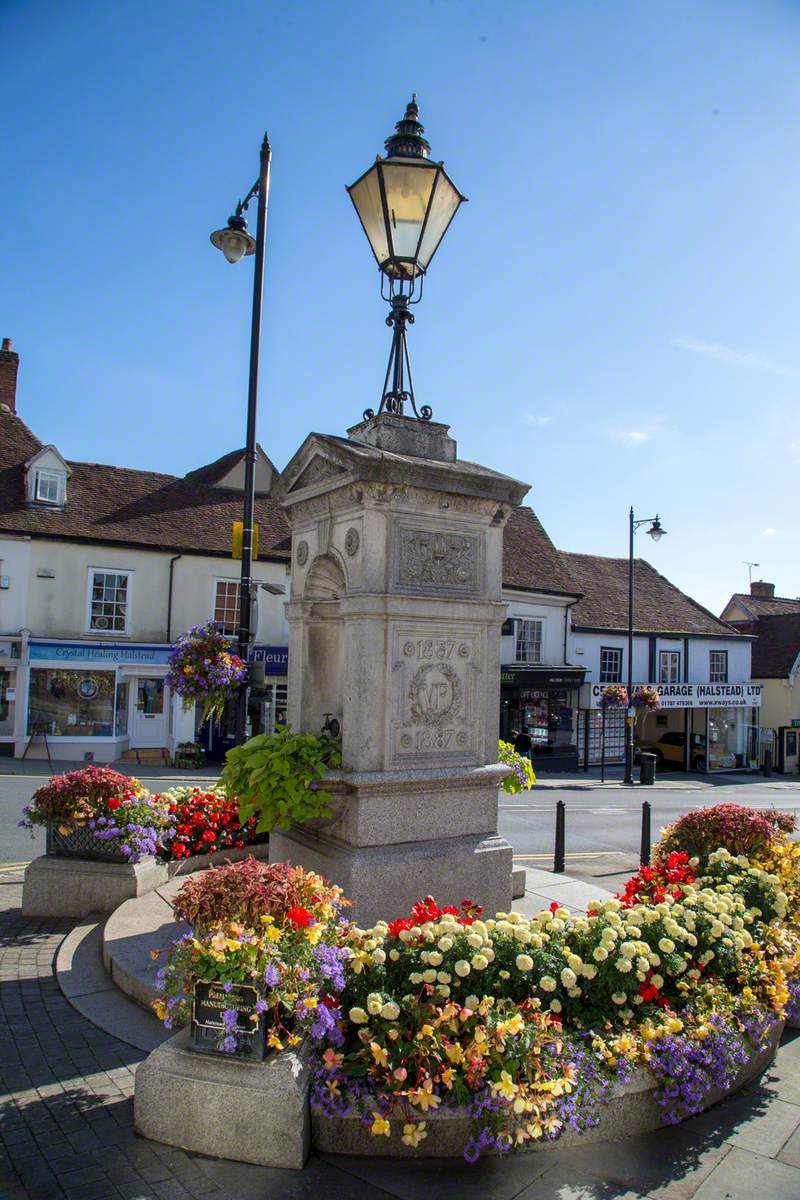
The Jubilee Drinking Fountain (1888) designed by Leonard Shuffrey

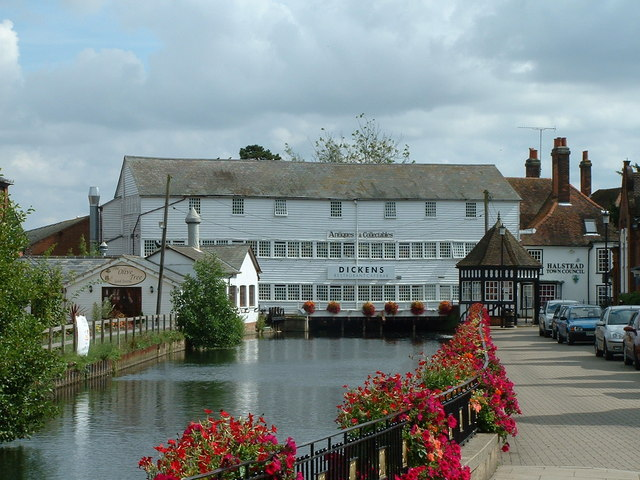
Townsford Mill, now the antiques centre

The wide High Street is dominated by the 14th-century Church of St Andrew, which was extensively renovated in the Victorian period, but retains much older decoration, including tomb monuments from the 14th century and earlier.

The historic core of Halstead can be viewed on a walk up the market hill. Several buildings on the Market Hill contain structures that date from the 14th century including Whispers wine bar which was an oratory with six priests. It contains a fine wooden hammer-beam ceiling with carved angel newel-post. There is a river walk running through the town from east to west. Just outside the town is Broaks Wood, a popular area for walking owned by the Forestry Commission. Halstead Public Gardens were established in 1900 and are noted for their floral displays. The town has secured both Silver and Gold Awards in the annual Britain in Bloom competition on multiple occasions since 2000 and these displays have drawn many tourists to the town. The Antiques Centre inside Townsford Mill sells goods ranging from clothing to household items.

== Mills and industry ==
Townsford Mill spans the river at the bottom of the town houses. In 1818, Samuel Courtauld built two mills, Townsford at Halstead and another at Bocking. At the end of 1824, Halstead Mill was sold to Stephen Beuzeville. In 1825, Samuel installed a steam engine at Bocking Mill. An agreement dated 19 January 1825 was drawn up between Beuzeville and Samuel Courtauld and partners for the conversion of Halstead Mill for silk throwing.

Beuzeville was to provide the expertise, capital and silk; Courtauld was to erect the power looms and operate the mill in return for a share in the profits; Beuzeville was to take delivery of the yarn and manufacture the crêpe, on which he was a technical expert with 20 years' experience. The mill appears to have been in operation by the summer of 1825, with Joseph Ash as manager.

The introduction of new technology was important, but the mills remained heavily dependent on labour, much of which was provided by Belgian refugees emigrating to avoid religious persecution.. The looms required supervision by an army of young female workers. Even in 1838, more than 92 per cent of the workforce was female.

In 1827 Stephen Beuzeville was declared bankrupt; a formal deed of sale dated 11 April 1828 was created between the commissioners in bankruptcy and Samuel Courtauld, whereby Halstead Mill (subject to charges of £300) was sold to Courtaulds for a cash payment of £1,500. Stephen and his father joined Courtaulds as employees.

On the death of Queen Victoria in 1901, much of the black crepe for her funeral cortege was made at Townsford Mill by Samuel Courtauld's company.

Parts of the original Courtauld factory are listed buildings and survived the wholesale demolition of the silk factory in the early 1980s. Principal amongst these is Factory Terrace - Victorian townhouses built for Courtauld's managers which are Grade II* listed.

=== Evans Electroselenium ===
Arthur Evans was an industrialist, engineer and businessman who began manufacture of selenium photocells in a small workshop in Harlow, Essex, during the Second World War. These were of use in military applications and he was encouraged by the Government of National Unity to find larger premises and rapidly expand the business. He chose Halstead and found a site adjacent to St Andrews Church on Colchester Road. After the war, Evans Electroselenium Ltd (EEL) expanded into all types of scientific instruments which required photocells, including a flame photometer, colorimeters and atomic absorption instruments. Later, electrochemistry instruments were added. The business was eventually bought by Corning Inc and went through several mergers and acquisitions. Today it is part of Siemens Healthineers and operates only from the former Corning-EEL site in Sudbury, Suffolk. The Halstead site was redeveloped for housing as Evans Court in tribute to the founder. The Science Museum in London holds a collection of EEL scientific instruments. Others are held in the Halstead Town Museum collection.

== Amenities ==
Halstead has a library in a large open-plan building, built in 1864–1866 as the corn exchange. It has also housed a technical school. Nearby Moyns Park, a Grade I listed Elizabethan country house, is where Ian Fleming put the finishing touches to his novel From Russia, with Love, according to the cover text of some recent editions.

The town history society holds regular monthly meetings. There is a town museum attached to the town council offices featuring historical artefacts and objects of local interest. The Colne Valley Postal History Museum is a privately run museum of British postal history with one of the largest collections of post office letter boxes and telephone kiosks and is situated on Head Street. It holds regular open days throughout the year. The redundant Trinity Church, which was designed by Sir Giles Gilbert Scott is used for occasional concerts and art exhibitions. The Empire Theatre in Butler Road hosts occasional bingo nights. Halstead is home to Hume's Bakery, which opened in 1960 in the shop where it trades today.

The Jubilee Drinking Fountain was designed by the architect and architectural designer, Leonard Shuffrey. The stone drinking fountain was presented to the town by George Courtauld, and commemorates the Golden Jubilee of Queen Victoria.

== Schools ==
Halstead's three primary schools are Holy Trinity, St Andrew's and Richard de Clare. Its one secondary school is The Ramsey Academy (formerly Ramsey Secondary School), located to the north of the town centre. There are several other secondary schools within travelling distance; pupils commonly opt for Sible Hedingham, Braintree or Colchester. the independent Yellow House School at Sible Hedingham is an independent school for pupils with special needs. The two nearest further education colleges are at Braintree and the University of Essex at Colchester Campus.

== Places of worship ==
The Anglican parish church is St Andrew's in Parsonage Street. Holy Trinity Church, Halstead was declared redundant in April 1987 and is preserved by the Churches Conservation Trust.

Halstead also has a Methodist church, which opened as a Primitive Methodist chapel in 1874. Halstead Baptist Church is in Hedingham Road and Grace Baptist Church in Colchester Road, as is the Catholic Church of St Francis of Assisi. The United Reformed Church of Halstead is in Kings Road.

== Media ==
Local news and television programmes are provided by BBC East and ITV Anglia. Television signals are received from the Sudbury TV transmitter.

Local radio stations are BBC Essex on 103.5 FM, Heart East on 96.1 FM, Greatest Hits Radio East (formerly Dream 100 FM) on 100.2 FM, Actual Radio an DAB station and formerly, Leisure FM, a community based radio station that broadcast on 107.4 FM which ceased trading in 2023. Large parts of the valley floor are unable to receive the national D1 and D2 multiplex DAB signals due to their geography and the very low power of the Colchester "booster" transmitter (0.005 kW) so as not to interfere with Dutch broadcasting.

The local newspaper is the Halstead Gazette which publishes on Fridays.

== Sport ==
Halstead's main football club is Halstead Town F.C. It plays in the 9th tier of the English football league system, in the Essex senior league Premier Division.

The town is home to Halstead Cricket Club, which fields three teams in the Marshall Hatchick Two Counties Championship. For the 2011 season the club, with the help of club member and former Bangladesh bowling coach Ian Pont brought in Bangladeshi international cricketer Syed Rasel. Other players to have played both first-class cricket and for the club include former Essex and Leicestershire batsman Darren Robinson, international coach Richard Pybus and New Zealand double World Cup finalist Matt Henry.

Since 2010 the town has a rugby club, Halstead Templars R.F.C.

In 1921 the Courtauld Halstead Bowls Club was established at Courtauld Sports Ground. It marked its 100 years of Lawn Bowls in 2021, organising centenary matches with the England team, Essex team, North West Essex Bowling Association and several others. It competes annually in the North West Essex Bowling Association league, Sudbury Triples League, North Essex County Bowls Federation. Players compete in various Essex County competitions. The club has over 100 members and welcomes new ones.

== Governance ==
There are three tiers of local government covering Halstead, at parish (town), district, and county level: Halstead Town Council, Braintree District Council, and Essex County Council. The town council is based at Queen's Hall on Chipping Hill.

=== Administrative history ===
Halstead was an ancient parish in the Hinckford hundred of Essex. As well as the town itself, the parish also covered surrounding rural areas, including the hamlet of Greenstead Green.

In 1852, the parish was made a local board district, administered by an elected local board. It was subsequently decided that the whole parish should not be included in the local board district, and so in 1866 the district was redefined to just cover the parts of the parish within a 1,000-yard (914 m) radius of the bridge over the River Colne. Such local board districts were reconstituted as urban districts under the Local Government Act 1894, which also directed that civil parishes could no longer straddle district boundaries. The old Halstead parish was therefore split into a Halstead Urban parish matching the urban district and a Halstead Rural parish covering the remainder of the old parish outside the urban district.

Halstead Urban District was abolished in 1974 under the Local Government Act 1972, when the area became part of the new Braintree district. A successor parish called Halstead was created at the same time covering the area of the former urban district, with its parish council taking the name Halstead Town Council. Around the same time, the neighbouring parish of Halstead Rural was renamed to Greenstead Green and Halstead Rural. (Note: UKBMD says the change of name was in 1974, but the Ordnance Survey was showing the new name from 1968.)

== Arms ==
Coat of arms of Halstead Town Council
Notes Originally granted to Halstead Urban District Council on 20 November 1964, subsequently transferred to Halstead Town Council in 1974. Crest On a wreath of the colours in front of a saltire Azure on a mount Vert a garb Proper. Escutcheon Per chevron Vert and Azure in chief two weaver's shuttles erect Proper and in base a thunderbolt Or. Motto Consilio Et Prudentia (By Wisdom And Foresight).

== Notable people ==
In birth order:

- Robert Bourchier, 1st Baron Bourchier (died 1349), Lord Chancellor of England, had an estate here.
- John Bourchier, 2nd Baron Bourchier (died 1400), soldier and diplomat, inherited the estate here.
- Bartholomew Bourchier, 3rd Baron Bourchier (died 1409), politician, died at his estate here.
- Bernard Barton (1784–1849), Quaker poet, was apprenticed to a shopkeeper and married here.
- Dummy, the Witch of Sible Hedingham (c. 1788 – 1863), a deaf-mute charged with witchcraft, was beaten by a mob and died in Halstead workhouse.
- Samuel Courtauld (1793–1881), opened a textile mill here in 1818.
- George Courtauld (1802–1861), textile magnate, was married here in 1829.
- Isaac Baker Brown (1811–1873), gynaecologist and obstetrician, went to school here.
- Augustine Stow (1833–1903), Australian politician, was born here.
- Decimus Alfred Ball (1836–1890), slum landlord in London, was born here.
- Sir John Mark Davies (1840–1919), Australian politician, was born here.
- Samuel Courtauld (1876–1947), art collector and industrialist, became a director of the silk mill here in 1901.
- Gwen Ffrangcon-Davies (1891–1992), London-born actress, died here.
- Alan Sainsbury, Baron Sainsbury (1902–1998), grandson of the founder of the Sainsbury's supermarket chain, was a resident and died here.
- Steve Lamacq (born 1964), BBC Radio 6 Music DJ, grew up here, attended Ramsey School, and is a resident.
- Matt Cardle (born 1983), 2010 winner of The X Factor, is a resident.
