= John Courtauld =

British Conservative Party politician and architect (1880–1942)

John Courtauld MC MP

Member of Parliament for Chichester
- In office 29 October 1924 – 20 April 1942
- Preceded by: Charles Rudkin
- Succeeded by: Lancelot Joynson-Hicks

Personal details
- Born: 26 August 1880 Bocking, Braintree, Essex, United Kingdom of Great Britain and Ireland
- Died: 20 April 1942 (aged 61) Midhurst, Sussex, United Kingdom
- Party: Conservative
- Spouse(s): Henrietta Barbara Courtauld, née Holland (m. 1906)
- Children: 1
- Occupation: Politician; architect
- Awards: Military Cross

Military service
- Allegiance: United Kingdom
- Branch/service: British Army
- Rank: Major
- Battles/wars: First World War

Major John Sewell Courtauld, MC MP (30 August 1880–20 April 1942) was a British Conservative Party politician and architect.

== Early life and education ==
John "Jack" Sewell Courtauld was born on the 26 August 1880 to Sydney Courtauld (1840–1899) and Sarah Lucy Sharpe (1844–1906). Courtauld had two sisters, Sydney Renée Courtauld and Catharine Dowman (née Courtauld), and three brothers Sir William Courtauld, 1st Baronet, Samuel Courtauld, and Sir Stephen Courtauld. Courtauld was educated at Rugby School and at King's College, Cambridge.

On the 25 October 1906, Courtauld married Henrietta Barbara Courtauld (née Holland) at St Mary's Church in Wimbledon. The couple had one daughter.

== Military service ==
He saw active service in the First World War. He took up his Commission in October 1914, becoming a 2nd Lieutenant in the 6th Battn. Somerset Light Infantry. He was in France in May, 1915 and served in the Ypres Salient until March 1916. He was at Arras until September, 1916, then going to the Somme until November 1916. He was awarded the Military Cross in December 1916. He was appointed Director of Army Accounts and Quartermaster General of the Division, and later served in Salonika. He was gazetted Major in 1917 and received the Croix-de-Guene avec Palme at the close of the Palestine campaign.

== Career ==
He owned a company of architects, but at the 1924 general election he was elected as Member of Parliament (MP) for the constituency of Chichester, a safe Conservative seat. He was duly re-elected at the general elections of 1929, 1931 and 1935, until his death in 1942, aged 61. He had a London residence at 9 Grosvenor Square and in 1919 he acquired the Burton Park estate, West Sussex, within the Chichester constituency. He moved to a cottage on the estate after it was requisitioned by the Army at the start of the Second World War.

He had a longstanding interest in film production and in 1934 became Chairman of the Directors of a new company, British National Films Ltd. Colleagues on the Board were Lady Yule, J. Arthur Rank and Managing Director John Corfield

== Personal life ==
He was a breeder and owner of racehorses, and was an active member of the Jockey Club and Chairman of the Racecourse Betting Control Board

Parliament of the United Kingdom
Preceded by Charles Mark Clement Rudkin	Member of Parliament for Chichester; 1924–1942	Succeeded by Lancelot Joynson-Hicks
