= Mah-Jongg (lemur) =

Lemur

- Other name: Jongy
- Species: Ring-tailed lemur
- Sex: Male
- Died: 1938; Eltham Palace, Greenwich, United Kingdom
- Owners: Sir Stephen Lewis Courtauld MC FRGS; Lady Virginia Courtauld; Courtauld Family
- Residence: La Rochelle, Southern Rhodesia (now Zimbabwe); Eltham Palace, Greenwich, United Kingdom

Mah-Jongg was a ring-tailed lemur owned by Sir Stephen Lewis Courtauld MC FRGS and Lady Virginia Courtauld (née Peirano).

== Biography ==
Mah-Jongg, known as Jongy, was purchased at Harrods, one of London's most upmarket department stores, in 1923 and lived with the Courtaulds for fifteen years, accompanying the couple on their travels and changes of residence. Jongy died at their home, Eltham Palace, Greenwich, in 1938. Jongy had his own room there, which, like the rest of the house, was centrally heated – an innovation for its time. The room had a bamboo ladder that accessed the entrance to the house.

== Artistic representations ==
The Courtaulds refurbished Eltham Palace in the 1920s into an Art Deco mansion for entertaining, and had Jongy's likeness incorporated into artistic details. In the Billiard Room, a mural of St Cecilia, painted by Mary Adshead, features a lemur perched on the ledge between two painted columns. Jongy is featured in carved wooden roof bosses in the north bay of the Great Hall. In Leonard Campbell Taylor's portrait of the Courtaulds in the music room of their London townhouse (47 Grosvenor Square), Jongy sits next to Virginia, on the arm of her chair. Jongy's memorial consisted of a banded obelisk (in imitation of his tail) and a lead relief of the lemur. It was initially located at Eltham Palace but is now at the Courtaulds’ last home, La Rochelle in Southern Rhodesia, now Zimbabwe.

== Impact on Arctic expeditions ==
Stephen Courtuald sponsored the 1930-31 British Arctic Air Route Expedition, for which his cousin Augustine Courtauld served as metereologist. On the morning of the expedition's departure, the Courtaulds held a farewell lunch on board the yacht. Jongy bit the hand of Percy Lemon, the expedition's wireless operator, puncturing an artery. Iodine was provided, to which Lemon proved allergic. It took Lemon three months to recover, delaying the expedition.
