= Dowman =

Dowman is a surname. Notable people with the surname include:

- Catharine Dowman (1878–1972), British philanthropist and suffrage supporter
- Keith Dowman (born 1945), English Dzogchen teacher and translator of Tibetan Buddhist texts
- Mathew Dowman (born 1974), English cricketer
- Max Dowman (born 2009), English footballer
- Paul Darby-Dowman (born 1977), British sprint canoer
- Ruth Dowman (1930–2018), New Zealand long jumper
- Steve Dowman (born 1958), English footballer

== See also ==
- John Dolman (or Dowman; died 1526), English clergyman and benefactor
