= Courtauld Family =

British business family

- English business family of Huguenot origin
- Country: United Kingdom
- Place of origin: Saint-Pierre-d'Oléron, Kingdom of France; London, Kingdom of England
- Founder: George Courtauld (1744–1812); Augustin Courtauld (1655–1706)

The Courtauld Family is an English business family of Huguenot origin, active during the 17th–20th century.

== Members ==
- Augustin Courtauld (1655–1706), cooper, vintner and goldsmith. Arrived in London sometime between 1686 and 1687, fleeing Huguenot persecution in Saint-Pierre-d'Oléron.
  - Augustin Courtauld (c.1685/1686–c.1751), goldsmith, son of Augustin Courtauld.
  - Pierre Courtauld (1690–1729), silversmith, son of Augustin Courtauld.
  - Samuel Courtauld, I (1720–1765), silversmith, son of Anne Bardin and Augustin Courtauld; married Louisa Courtauld (née Ogier; 1729–1807), silversmith.
    - Samuel Courtauld, II (1752–1821), silversmith and merchant, son of Louisa Courtauld and Samuel Courtauld, I.
    - George Courtauld (1761–1823), industrialist, silk weaver and founder of ″George Courtauld & Co″ (later, Courtaulds), son of Louisa Courtauld and Samuel Courtauld, I; married Ruth Minton.
      - Samuel Courtauld (c.1793 – 1881), silk throwster, son of George Courtauld and Ruth Minton. Expanded ″George Courtauld & Co″ alongside his cousin Peter Taylor as ″Courtauld & Taylor″.
        - Louisa Ruth Lowe (née Harris), adopted daughter of Samuel Courtauld
      - Catherine Courtauld (1795–), daughter of George Courtauld and Ruth Minton
      - George Courtauld (1802 – 1861), son of George Courtauld and Ruth Minton; married Susanna Sewell (1803-1888)
        - George Courtauld JP (1830 – 1920), son of George Courtauld and Susanna Sewell
          - Katherine Courtauld (1856 – 1935), daughter of George Courtauld and first wife Mina Courtauld (née Bromley); partner of Mary Gladstone (1856 – 1941)
          - Samuel Augustine Courtauld JP (1865 – 1953), son of George Courtauld and second wife Susanna Elizabeth Courtauld (nee Savill)
          - Elizabeth Courtauld (1867 – 1947), pioneer physician, daughter of George Courtauld and Susanna Elizabeth Courtauld (nee Savill)
        - Samuel Augustine Courtauld (1833 – 1854), son of George Courtauld and Susanna Sewell
        - Louis Courtauld (1834–), son of George Courtauld and Susanna Sewell; married Elizabeth Robinson
        - Susanna Ruth Courtauld (1838–), daughter of George Courtauld and Susanna Sewell; married Lewis Barrett Solly
        - Sydney Courtauld JP (1840 – 1899), son of George Courtauld and Susanna Sewell; married Sarah Lucy Sharpe (1803 – 1888)
          - Sir William Julien Courtauld, 1st Baronet, JP (1870 – 1940), son of Sydney Courtauld and Sarah Lucy Sharpe
          - Sydney Renée Courtauld (1873 – 1962), Suffragette and philanthropist, daughter of Sydney Courtauld and Sarah Lucy Sharpe
          - Samuel Courtauld, (1876 – 1947) industrialist and founder of Courtauld Institute of Art, son of Sydney Courtauld and Sarah Lucy Sharpe; married Elizabeth Theresa Frances Kelsey
            - Sydney Elizabeth Courtauld (1902–1954), daughter of Samuel Courtauld and Elizabeth Theresa Frances Kelsey; married Rab Butler, Baron Butler of Saffron Walden (1902 – 1982)
          - Catharine Dowman (née Courtauld; 1878 – 1972), Suffragette and philanthropist known for the restoration of the Cutty Sark, daughter of Sydney Courtauld and Sarah Lucy Sharpe; married Captain Wilfred Harry Dowman (1879–1936)
          - John Courtauld (1880 – 1942), Conservative Party politician, son of Sydney Courtauld and Sarah Lucy Sharpe
          - Sir Stephen Lewis Courtauld MC FRGS (1883 – 1967), patron and philanthropist, son of Sydney Courtauld and Sarah Lucy Sharpe; married Lady Virginia Courtauld (née Peirano; 1885 – 1972).

== Other members ==
- Augustine "August" Courtauld (1904 – 1959), Arctic explorer, son of Samuel Augustine Courtauld and cousin of Samuel Courtauld (1876 – 1947); married Mollie Courtauld (née Montgomerie; later Lady Butler of Saffron Walden} (1907 – 2009)
- Peter Taylor, expanded ″George Courtauld & Co″ alongside his cousin Samuel Courtauld (c.1793 – 1881) as ″Courtauld & Taylor″.
  - Peter Alfred Taylor MP, politician, anti-vaccinationist and radical, son of Peter Taylor; married Clementia Taylor (née Doughty; 1810–1908), English women's rights activist and radical. Partner of ″Courtauld & Taylor″ from 1840.
- Rab Butler, Baron Butler of Saffron Walden (1902 – 1982) politician, widower of Sydney Elizabeth Courtauld (1902–1954); second husband of Lady Mollie Butler of Saffron Walden (née Montgomerie, formerly Courtauld;1907–2009), widow of Augustine "August" Courtauld (1904–1959)

== See also ==
- Mah-Jongg (–1938) a ring-tailed lemur owned by Lady Virginia Courtauld and Sir Stephen Lewis Courtauld.
