= Charles Rudkin =

British politician (1872–1957)

Charles Rudkin DSO

Member of Parliament for Chichester
- In office 6 December 1923 – 9 October 1924
- Preceded by: Sir William Bird
- Succeeded by: John Courtauld

Personal details
- Born: 12 November 1872
- Died: 30 December 1957 (aged 85)
- Party: Liberal Party
- Education: Winchester College; Trinity College, Oxford
- Profession: Politician; Soldier; Barrister; Agriculturist

Brigadier-General Charles Mark Clement Rudkin DSO (12 November 1872 – 30 December 1957) was a British soldier, barrister, agriculturist, determined traveller and Liberal Party politician.

== Family ==
Rudkin was born in County Louth in 1872, the son of Major H W Rudkin. His family is said to have come from Corries in County Carlow. He remained single until late in life when, on 29 September 1939, aged 66, at Ninfield Church in Sussex, he married Marie the daughter of Thomas Russell from Ascog in Argyll and Bute a Deputy Lieutenant of Bute.

== Career ==
=== Soldier ===
Rudkin served in the South African War. He was aide-de-camp to Paul Methuen, 3rd Baron Methuen and went on to command an Artillery brigade between 1899 and 1902. He was awarded the Queen's South Africa Medal with four clasps and the King's South Africa Medal with two clasps. He commanded the Royal Artillery Reserve at the Coronation of King George V in 1911. He received the 1902 and 1911 Coronation Medals for his role in the coronation parades.

Rudkin served in the European theatre of the First World War from 1914 to 1918, in France, Belgium, and Italy. He commanded an Artillery Division at Ypres, the Somme, and on Asiago Plateau in Italy. During these campaigns Rudkin was wounded twice. He was twice mentioned in despatches and received the Distinguished Service Order in 1918, the 1914 Star and two Italian awards, the Medaglia al Valore and the Croce di Guerra. He ended his military career with the rank of Brigadier-General.

=== The Law ===
Rudkin studied law and was called to the Bar at Lincoln's Inn in 1912.

== Politics ==
Rudkin first stood for Parliament as Liberal candidate in Chichester at the 1923 general election defeating the sitting Conservative Member of Parliament, Sir William Bird. However, he was unable to hold the seat at the 1924 general election losing to the new Tory candidate John Sewell Courtauld. Rudkin did not fight Chichester again in 1929 switching to the nearby seat of Portsmouth South. In a four-cornered contest however, Rudkin could only come bottom of the poll, despite 1929 seeing a modest Liberal revival nationally. He did not contest a Parliamentary seat again.

== Travel ==
Rudkin was an enthusiastic traveller. He visited and shot in Africa, Australia, India, and Canada. Rudkin travelled in America, New Zealand, Tasmania, China, Burma, Fiji, Samoa, Japan, Hawaii, Ceylon and extensively in Europe, including Russia. He travelled twice round the world. In 1921, still very much the early days of aviation, he undertook a flight over the Alps in the company of the French pilot Marcel Nappez, rising to a height of more than 10,000 feet.

== Agriculture ==
Rudkin took a keen interest in the development of agriculture and took it upon himself to learn about progress in the industry by visiting a number of foreign and Commonwealth countries including Holland, Sweden, Norway, Belgium, France, Canada, America, Australia, and New Zealand where he educated himself by observation and inspection of farming techniques.

== Other honours ==
Rudkin was made a Freeman of the City of London and was a member of the Royal Academy.

== Death ==
Rudkin died at his home in Umtali in what was then known as Southern Rhodesia on 30 December 1957 aged 85 years.

Parliament of the United Kingdom
Preceded by Sir William Bird	Member of Parliament for Chichester; 1923 – 1924	Succeeded by John Sewell Courtauld
