= William Bird (solicitor) =

British solicitor and Conservative politician

Sir William Bird
- Sir William Bird

Member of Parliament for Chichester
- In office 23 April 1921 – 16 November 1923
- Preceded by: Lord Edmund Talbot
- Succeeded by: Charles Rudkin

Personal details
- Born: 11 July 1855
- Died: 13 November 1950 (aged 95)
- Party: Conservative
- Profession: Politician

Sir William Barrott Montfort Bird (11 July 1855 – 13 November 1950) was a British solicitor and briefly a Conservative politician.

The son of William Frederic Wratislaw Bird, of Wilmington in Kent, he was educated at Bruce Castle School and admitted as a solicitor 1880. He was a director of Williams Deacon's Bank, and of other companies, and was justice of the peace for West Sussex. In 1895 he married Margaret Elizabeth, daughter of Henry Spencer, and widow of James H. Murray.

He was elected unopposed as member of parliament for Chichester at a by-election in April 1921 following the resignation of the sitting Conservative MP Lord Edmund Bernard Talbot, who had been appointed as Lord Lieutenant of Ireland.

At the 1922 general election, Bird was re-elected with a massive majority over his only opponent, a Labour Party candidate. However, he faced a Liberal Party opponent for the first time at the 1923 general election, and lost his seat. He did not stand for Parliament again.

Parliament of the United Kingdom
Preceded by Lord Edmund Bernard Talbot	Member of Parliament for Chichester; 1921 – 1923	Succeeded by Charles Rudkin
