= Rolf Engströmer =

Swedish architect and designer (1892–1970)

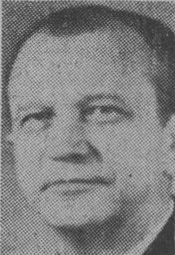
- Born: 20 January 1892; Hudiksvall, Gävleborg County, Sweden
- Died: 2 August 1970 (aged 78); Stockholm, Sweden
- Education: KTH Royal Institute of Technology
- Occupations: Architect, interior designer, and furniture designer
- Notable work: Eltham Palace, MS Kungsholm Interiors

Rolf Engströmer (20 January 1892 – 2 August 1970) was a Swedish architect, interior designer, and furniture designer. He is known for his work in the Swedish Grace style.

== Biography and work ==
Engströmer was born in 1892 in Hudiksvall in Gävleborg County, Sweden. He received his education as an architect at KTH Royal Institute of Technology in Stockholm between 1914 and 1919, before working for architects including Ragnar Hjorth, Carl Bergsten, and Gunnar Asplund in Stockholm.

At Bergsten, he worked, among other things, with the interior design of the ship MS Kungsholm, where he, along with the artist and friend Jerk Werkmäster, was responsible for the design of the first-class party and music room.

Engströmer also participated as an architect at the Stockholm Exhibition in 1930, as an employee of Asplund. During the 1930s, he had its own furniture and interior design company, located on Arsenalsgatan in Stockholm, which was called "Jefta".

Engströmer's other works include the interior of the Rigoletto Cinema on Kungsgatan in Stockholm and the renovation of Eltham Palace in Greenwich in London, where he designed the entrance hall together with Jerk Werkmäster.

== Gallery of selected works ==
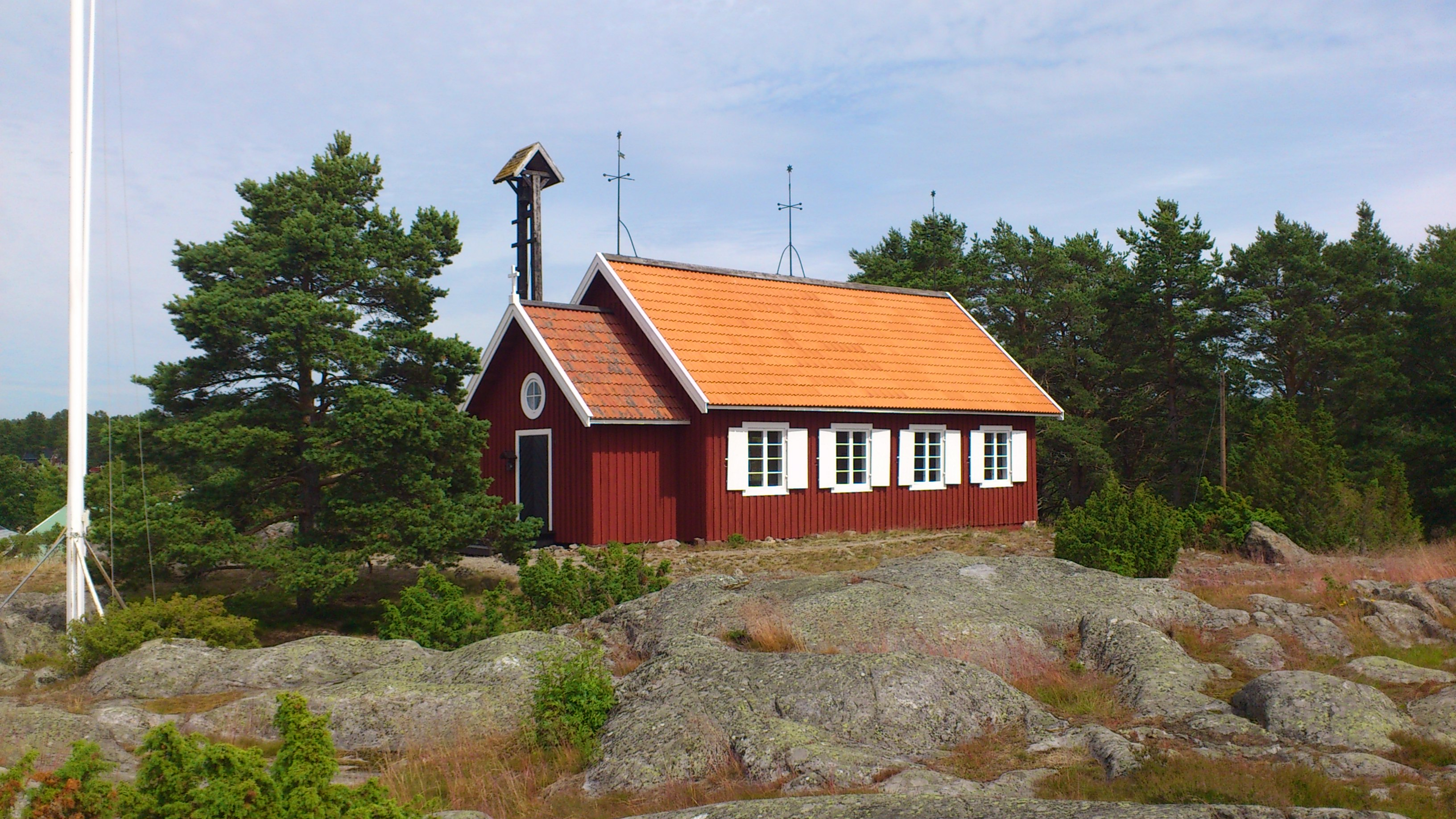
Hölicks Chapel

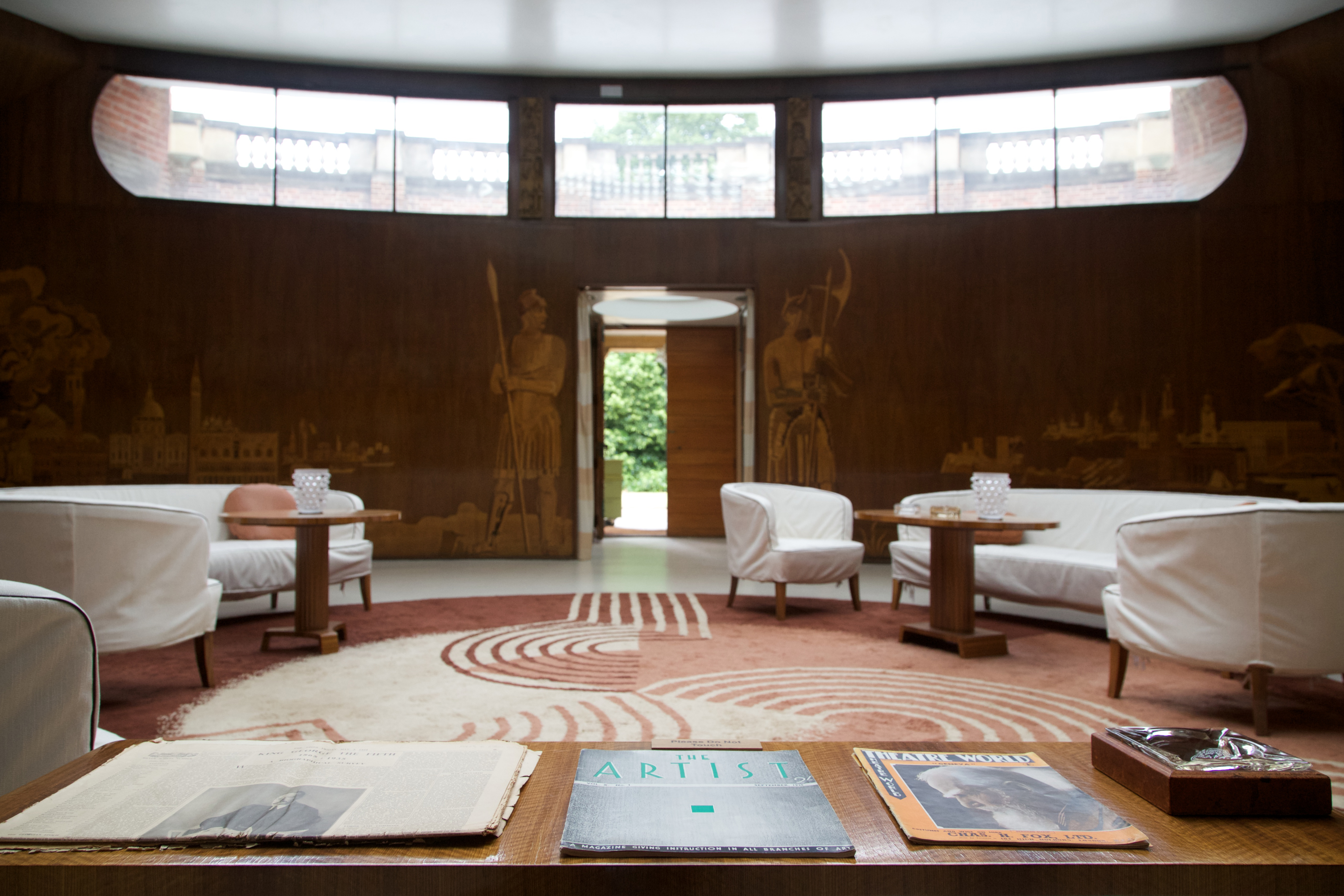
Eltham Palace, Entrance Hall

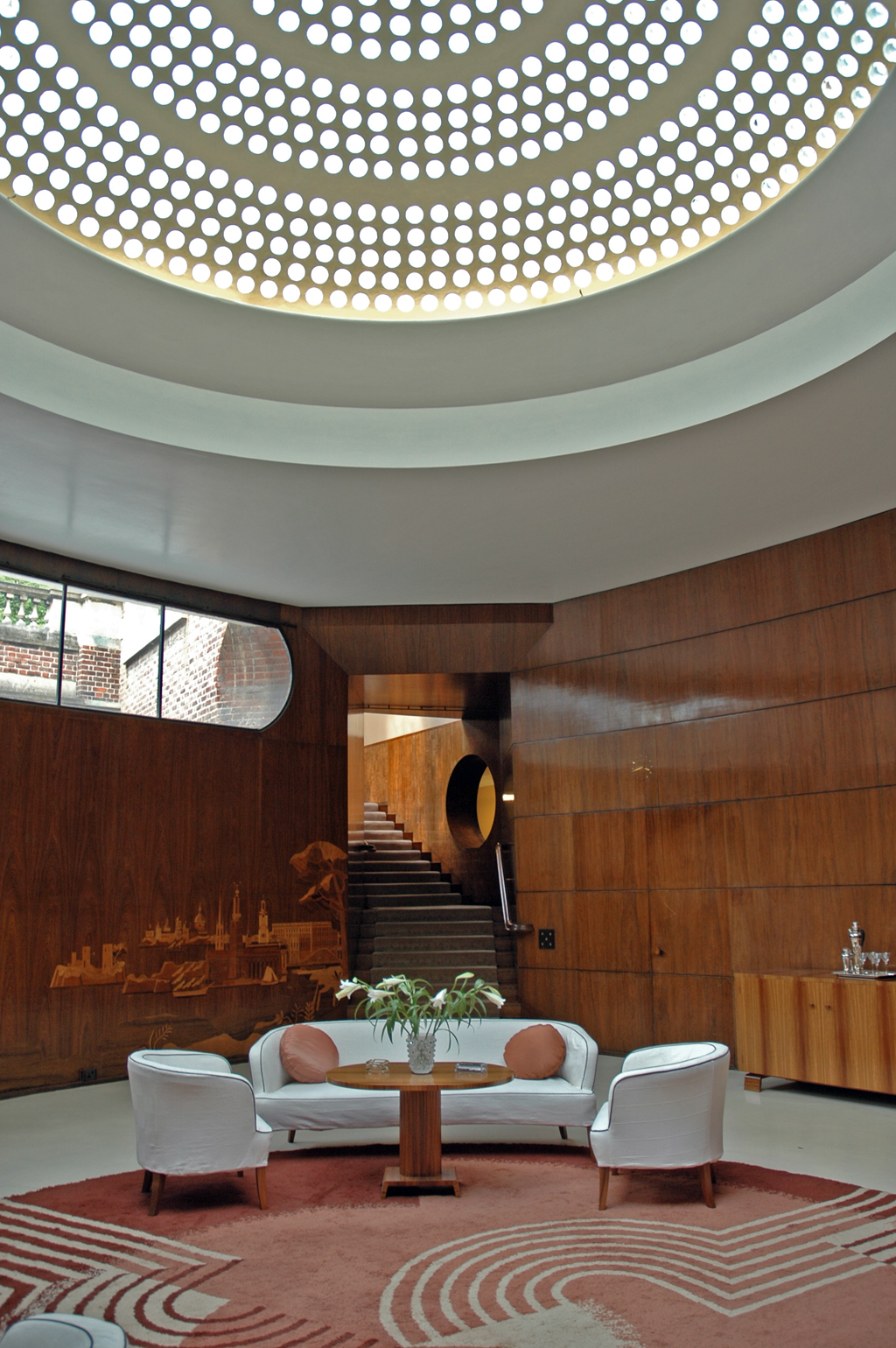
Eltham Palace, Entrance Hall

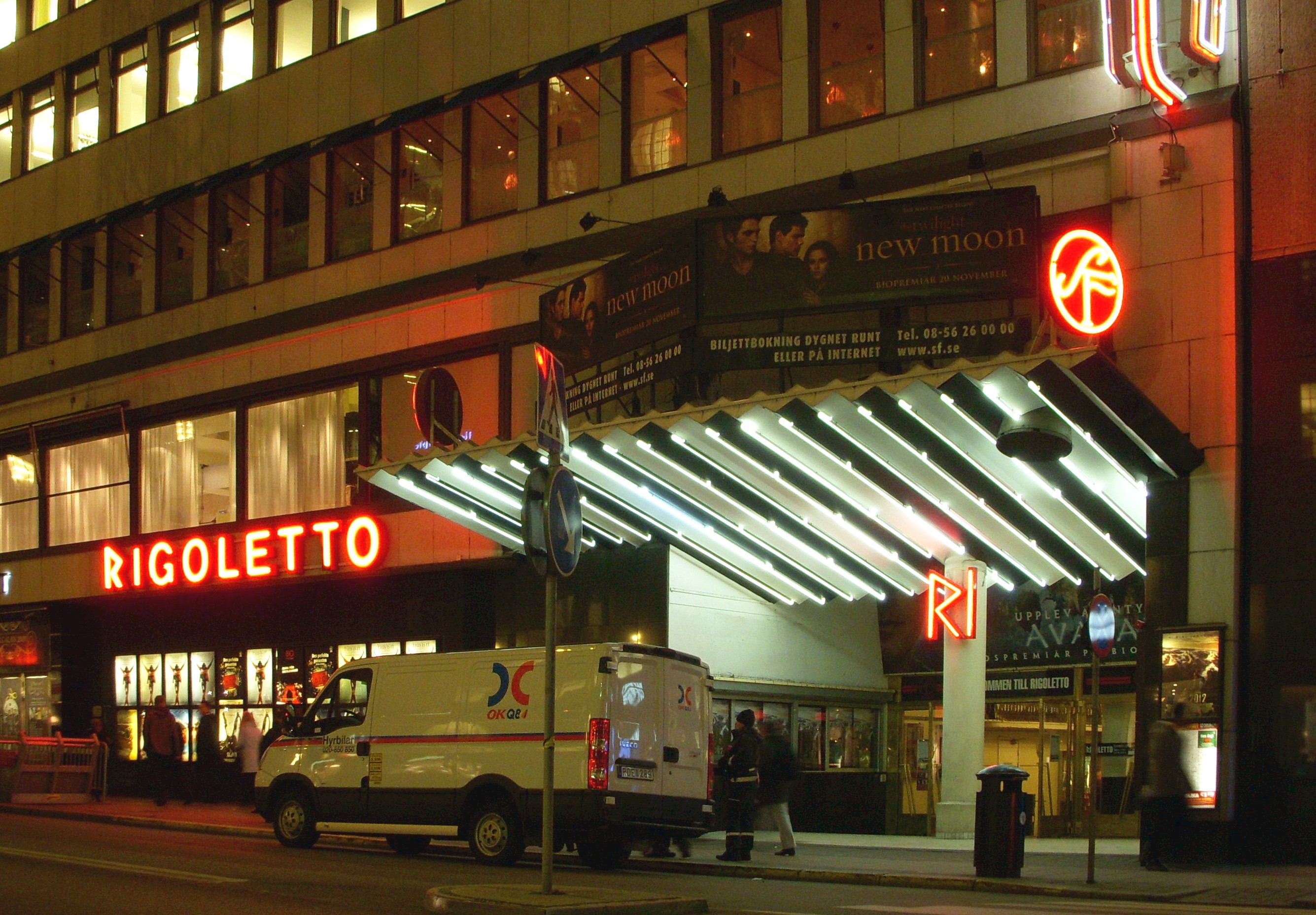
Rigoletto Cinema, Stockholm

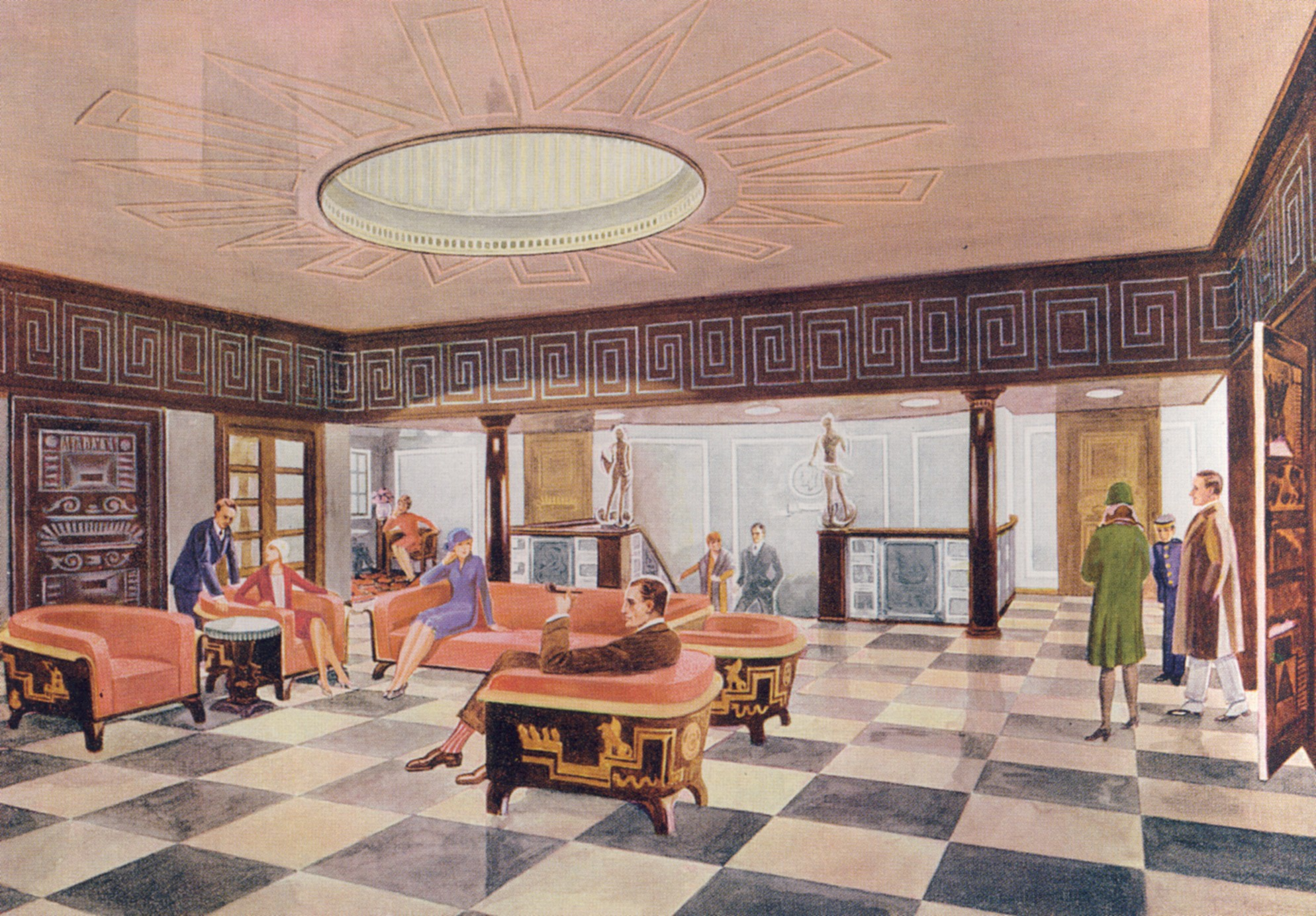
MS Kungsholm

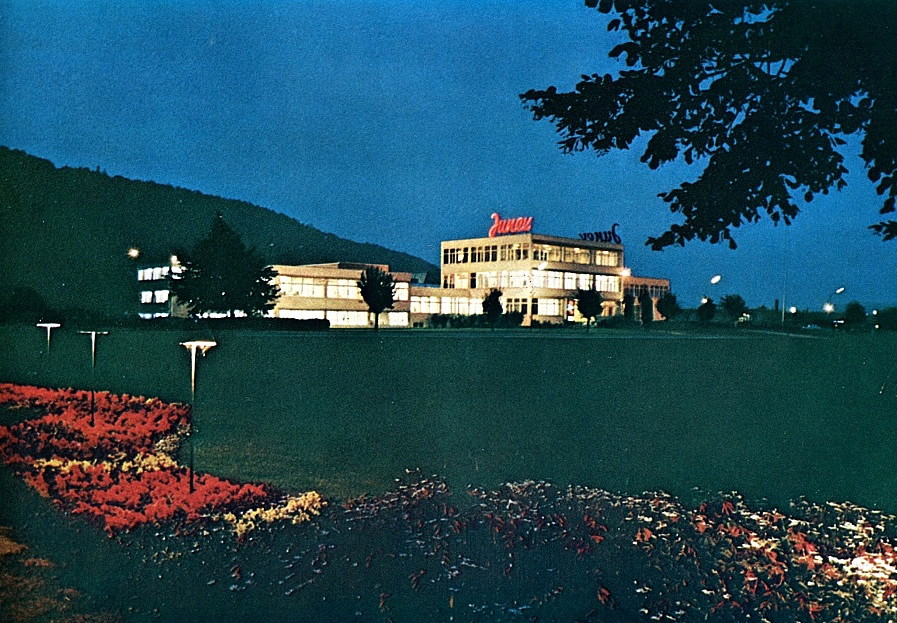
Junex textile factory, Huskvarna, 1936
