= Virginia Courtauld =

Romanian-born philanthropist (1885–1972)

Lady Virginia Courtauld
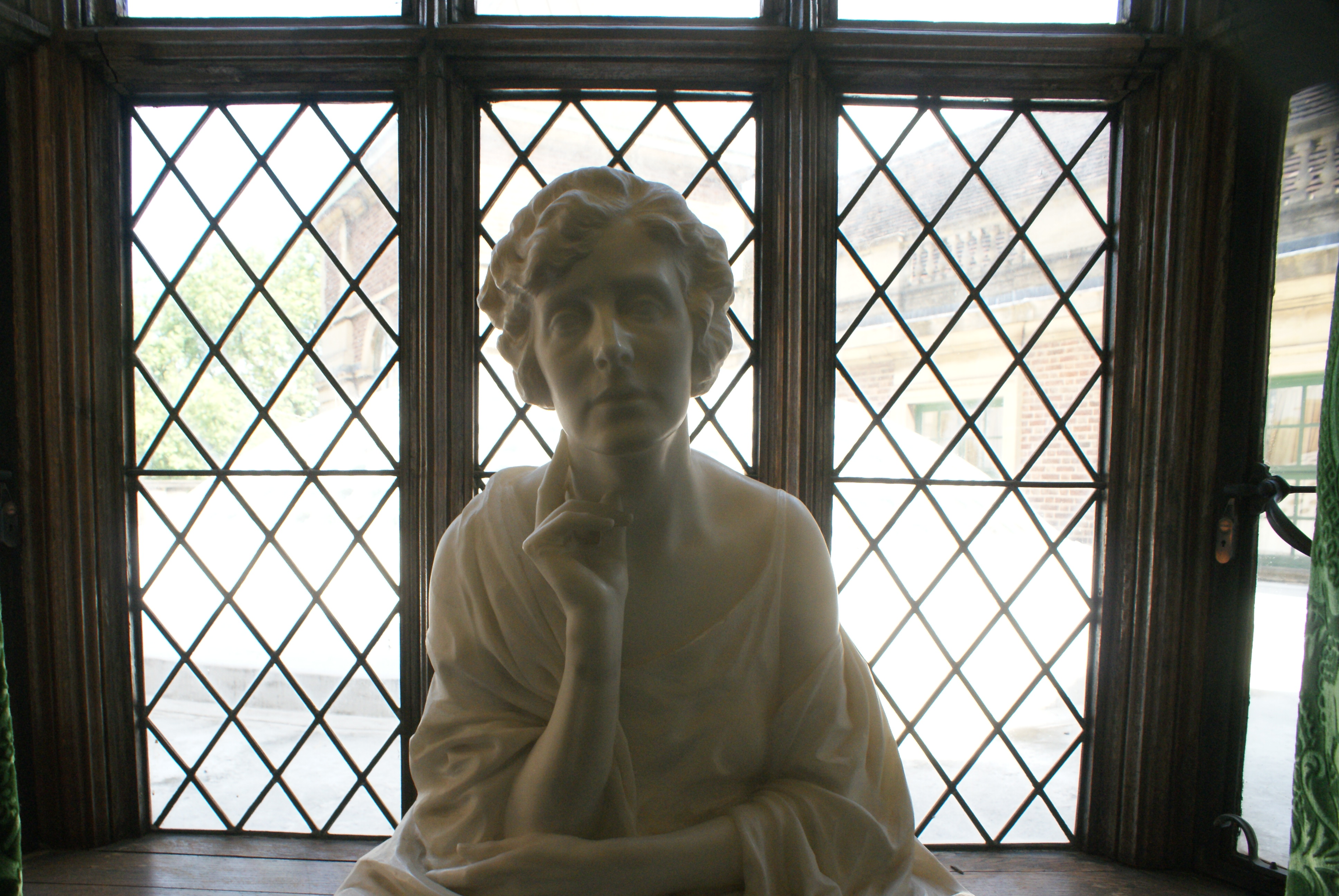
- "Portrait Bust of Virginia Courtauld", Filippo Lovatelli, 1923
- Born: Vergilia Rosa Vester; 7 January 1885; Brăila, Kingdom of Romania
- Died: 20 December 1972 (aged 87); Jersey, Channel Islands, British Crown Dependency
- Other names: Ginie Peirano; Ginie Courtauld; Virginia Spinola Peirano; Virginia Peirano Courtauld; Virginia Courtauld Peirano
- Citizenship: Italian (1885–); British (c.1925–); Rhodesian (1954–)
- Occupation: Philanthropist
- Known for: The Art Deco renovation of Eltham Palace; Former co-owner of La Rochelle
- Spouses: Marchese Paolo Spinola di Luccoli (m. 1910; div. 1923) Sir Stephen Courtauld MC FRGS (m. 1923; died 1967)
- Family: House of Spinola (by marriage, 1910–1923); Courtauld Family (by marriage,1923–)

Lady Virginia Courtauld (Known name of Virginia Peirano; formerly Spinola Peirano) was a Romanian-born philanthropist and member of the Courtauld Family, known for the Art Deco renovation of Eltham Palace and co-owning the La Rochelle country estate.

== Early life ==
Virginia Peirano was born Vergilia Rosa Vester^{α} on 7 January 1885 in Brăila, to a Hungarian mother, Rosa Balint Peirano (1860–1940), and an Italian father, Riccardo Peirano (1854–1930). Peirano's father was a shipping merchant, whose family left Genoa in the late nineteenth century and established a grain-exporting business in the Romanian port city of Brăila.

Peirano had two older brothers, Riccardo Jr. "Richard" Peirano (1880–c.1918–c.1923) and Enrico "Henry" Peirano (1881–). Peirano's parents married on the 30 November 1886.

Peirano's childhood was spent in London, where she was educated at convent school.

== Italy ==
In December 1908, Riccardo Peirano dissolved his partnership in the family business "Peirano & Co.," leaving control of the company to his eldest son Richard Peirano and to George Nicholas Gologan of the Romanian Consulate. In either late 1909 or early 1910, Peirano relocated with her parents to Santa Margherita, Liguria . In May 1910, the Peirano family rented a villa within the private park of the then Villa Spinola, owned by the Marquis Ugo Spinola (1853–1925) and Solferina Serra Spinola (1859–1944).

In 1910, Peirano met the Marchese Paolo Spinola (1880–1969), the Spinola's third and youngest son and a member of the Luccoli branch of the House of Spinola. Within months of knowing each other, Peirano and Spinola broke with social convention and traveled together to Paris and London. On the 24 November 1910, Peirano and Spinola were married at the Cathedral of Saint Lawrence in Genoa. Honeymooning in the Khedivate of Egypt, the couple continued to travel extensively throughout their marriage.

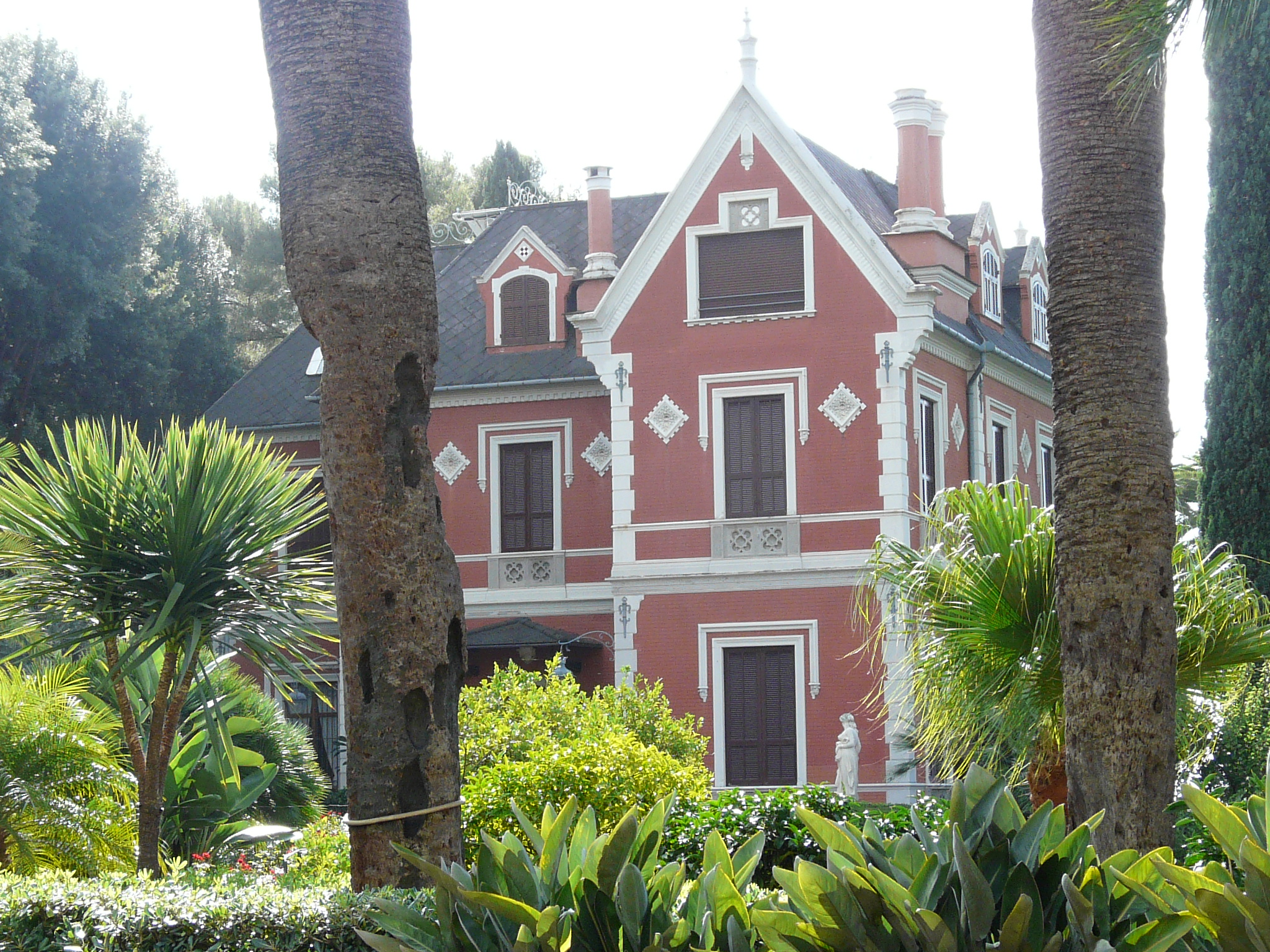
Villa del Trattato, built for Paolo Spinola and Virginia Peirano

Peirano and Spinola lived between London and the "villino Pagana n.8" on the Villa Spinola estate. In 1913, Ugo and Solferina Spinola commissioned the "neova villa" (Later known as the Villa del Trattato) to be built for the couple on the Villa Spinola Estate. Styled after the Villa Serra di Comago, the Villa del Trattato was completed in 1915 however, Peirano and Spinola never lived in the property. Initially passionate, Peirano's and Spinola's marriage was strained by class and cultural differences which saw Peirano struggle to fit in with the conservative Spinola family. In 1919, Peirano met Stephen Courtauld in Courmayeur whilst on a skiing holiday with Spinola, and formed a romantic relationship.

Peirano and Luccoli separated in either the spring or summer of 1920, and finalised their divorce in Fiume (present-day Rijeka, Croatia) in 1923. Peirano married Stephen Courtauld in Fiume soon after, whilst Spinola formed a long term relationship with the actress Hydée Urbani.

== Eltham Palace ==
As a wedding present, Stephen Courtauld gifted Peirano a pet ring-tailed lemur named Mah-Jongg, who lived and traveled with the couple for the next 15 years.

In 1933, the couple acquired a 99-year-lease on Eltham Palace, and completed an Art Deco renovation. Following a bombing on Eltham Palace in 1944, the Courtauld's gave up their lease and moved to Scotland.

== Rhodesia ==
In 1951, the Courtauld's moved to Southern Rhodesia (present-day Zimbabwe), and commissioned the building of the La Rochelle country estate. The Courtaulds supported non-racialism, were personal friends of Hastings Banda and advocated for Rhodesian black rule. Following Stephen Courtauld death in 1967, Peirano reportedly began financially supporting members of the Zimbabwe African National Liberation Army crossing the Mozambique–Zimbabwe border.

== Jersey ==
Peirano left Zimbabwe in 1970, and lived with family in St Lawrence, Jersey.

== In popular culture ==
The 2017 book Virginia, un mondo perduto. Scene da un matrimonio Belle Epoque di casa Spinola (English: Virginia, a Lost World. Scenes from a Belle Epoque Marriage at Casa Spinola) was edited by Galleria nazionale di palazzo Spinola. In 2018, Peirano was honoured at the Rose Festival in Busalla (Italian: Festa delle Rose di Busalla).

The 2019 historical fiction book The Dragon Lady is based on Peirano's life.

The Indonesian orchid Vanda lombokensis 'Virginia Courtauld' is named after Peirano.

== Notes ==
^α It is unclear why Peirano was given the surname Vester.

== See also ==
- Treaty of Rapallo, signed at Villa del Trattato
