= La Rochelle (Zimbabwe) =

Country estate in Zimbabwe

- La Rochelle Country House and Spa Mutare
- Location within Zimbabwe
- Interactive map of La Rochelle
- 18°54′24″S 32°41′29″E
- Location: Penalonga, Mutasa District, Manicaland Province, Zimbabwe
- Nearest city: Mutare

History
- Built: 1951–1953
- Built for: Sir Stephen Courtauld MC FRGS; Lady Virginia Courtauld, née Peirano
- Original use: Country estate, and botanical gardens

Site notes
- Area: 108 ha (approximately)
- Restored: 2014–2015
- Current use: Hotel, and centre of agricultural education
- Governing body: The National Trust of Zimbabwe

La Rochelle is a country estate situated in the Imbeza Valley of the Eastern Highlands mountain range. Owned by the National Trust of Zimbabwe, the estate was originally built for Sir Stephen Courtauld MC FRGS and Lady Virginia Courtauld, née Peirano.

== History ==
The house at La Rochelle was built by Sir Stephen Courtauld and his wife Lady Virginia Courtauld, who settled in Southern Rhodesia in 1951. Architects were invited to design an ambitious property intended for entertainment on a grand scale. The construction of the house was completed in April 1953 and the Courtaulds' fine collection of furniture, paintings and other art from their former home Eltham Palace in London was brought to La Rochelle. A large botanical garden incorporating an arboretum and pinetum was established with the professional help of the British horticulturist John Henry Mitchell. The indigenous wild bush lands in the grounds were also carefully preserved. Orchid houses containing exotic, rare and indigenous orchids were also established.

The Courtaulds frequently entertained at La Rochelle and held weekly grand dinners for local people and overseas guests. Visitors to Government House in Salisbury (now Harare) regularly went on to La Rochelle as part of their visit to Rhodesia. Distinguished visitors were asked to engrave their signatures with a diamond-tipped stylus on the two large end windows in the house. Signatures include those of Rab Butler, Sybil Thorndike, Julian Amery, Julian Huxley, and Laurens van der Post.

The Courtaulds were very active philanthropists in Rhodesia. Their achievements included the funding of the construction of buildings for the Courtauld Theatre and Queen's Hall in Mutare, and the auditorium of what is now the Zimbabwe College of Music in Harare. Stephen Courtauld presided as chairman of the Board of Trustees of the what is now National Gallery of Zimbabwe. He contributed to the construction costs and provided a substantial endowment fund for the Gallery. The Courtaulds were sponsors of the Capricorn Africa Society, a pressure movement that sought to improve relations between races in the British-administered countries of sub-Saharan Africa. In 1964 the Courtaulds funded the establishment of an agricultural training school named 'Kukwanisa' in the Tsonzo area of Nyanga for African smallholder farmers, which was destroyed during the subsequent war years.

Stephen Courtauld died in Rhodesia in 1967 and Virginia moved to Jersey in 1970, aged 86. In accordance with her husband's wishes, she left the property to the Rhodesian National Trust, requesting that La Rochelle be used as “a venue for conferences either of a public, national, international or educational character”.

== Recent developments ==
After periods of disuse and shortages of funding the property was restored and gardens rejuvenated in 2014–15. A hotel with conference facilities incorporating the Courtaulds' house was opened in 2015, and an organic herb farm, with an associated farming training centre, was established in the grounds.
