= Sydney Renée Courtauld =

British suffragist and philanthropist

- Born: 1873; Bocking, Essex, United Kingdom
- Died: 26 February 1962 (aged 89); Weymouth, Dorset, United Kingdom
- Education: Newnham College, Cambridge, 1892–1894
- Occupations: Suffragist; philanthropist
- Parents: Sydney Courtauld (father); Sarah Lucy Courtauld, née Sharpe (mother)
- Family: Courtauld Family

Sydney Renée Courtauld (1873–1962) was a British suffragist, philanthropist, and member of the Courtauld Family known for her contributions to the women's suffrage movement and her involvement in social reform initiatives.

== Early life and education ==
Sydney Renée Courtauld was born in 1873 in Bocking, Essex. Her mother, Sarah Lucy Courtald (née Sharpe; 1844–1906) was an advocate for education reform, and her father, Sydney Courtauld (1840–1899) was a Justice of the Peace and silk manufacturer.

Members of the Unitarian faith, the Courtauld family placed emphasis on social reform and suffrage. Courtald's family used their wealth from the textile industry to fund schools, hospitals, and other philanthropic ventures. Courtauld's brother Samuel Courtauld founded the Courtauld Institute of Art.

From 1892 to 1894, Courtauld studied at Newnham College, Cambridge.

== Suffrage movement ==
Sydney Renée Courtauld played an active role in the women's suffrage movement. She was affiliated with organizations such as the Mid Bucks Suffrage Society and the London Society for Women's Suffrage. In 1913, she served as secretary of the North and East Essex branch of the National Union of Women's Suffrage Societies (NUWSS), advocating for women's voting rights through non-militant methods. Her family had a long history of supporting suffrage; two relatives signed the first mass suffrage petition to Parliament in 1866.

== Philanthropy ==
Renée inherited significant wealth following her parents' deaths, which allowed her to dedicate herself to philanthropy without financial constraints. She contributed to causes such as animal welfare and education. Her will included donations to animal welfare charities, and she left her house and property to the National Trust.

== Personal life ==
Sydney Renée Courtauld never married. She lived with her younger sister Catharine Courtauld at Bocken, their Arts and Crafts-style home in Great Missenden, Buckinghamshire. The sisters hosted events such as garden parties to raise funds for suffrage campaigns.

On the 26 February 1962, Courtauld died aged 89 in Weymouth, Dorset.
