= 1921 Chichester by-election =

UK Parliamentary by-election

The 1921 Chichester by-election was held on 23 April 1921. The by-election was held due to the resignation of the incumbent Coalition Conservative MP, Lord Edmund Talbot. It was won by the Coalition Conservative candidate William Bird, who was unopposed.

== Result ==
Chichester by-election, 1921
Party		Candidate	Votes	%	±%
C	Unionist	William Bird	Unopposed		
	Unionist hold				
C indicates candidate endorsed by the coalition government.
