= Sydney Courtauld =

British businessman (1840–1899)

- Born: 10 March 1840; Bocking, Braintree, Essex, United Kingdom of Great Britain and Ireland
- Died: 20 October 1899 (aged 59); Gosfield, Essex, United Kingdom of Great Britain and Ireland
- Organisation: Courtaulds
- Spouse(s): Sarah Lucy Courtauld, née Sharpe
- Children: Sir William Julien Courtauld, 1st Baronet, JP; Sydney Renée Courtauld; Samuel Courtauld; Catharine Dowman, née Courtauld; John Sewell Courtauld, MC MP; Sir Stephen Lewis Courtauld
- Parents: George Courtauld; Susanna Courtauld, née Sewell
- Family: Courtauld Family

Sydney Courtauld JP (1840–1899) was a Crêpe and Silk manufacturer, and part of the Courtauld family empire in Great Britain.

== Personal life ==
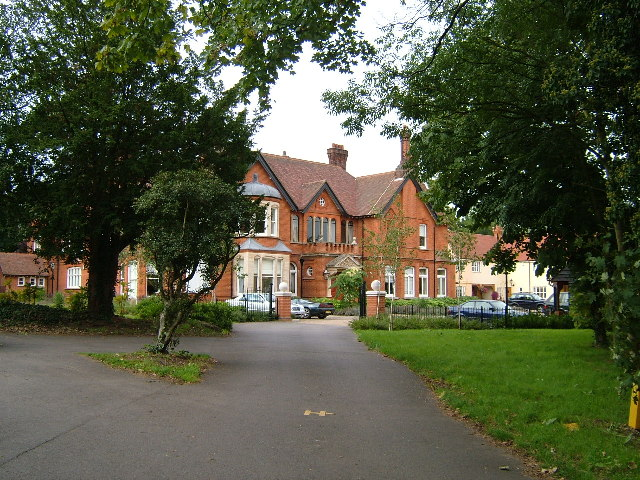
Bocking Place, Braintree, Essex

He was born on 10 March 1840 in Bocking, Braintree, Essex. He was the son of George Courtauld (1802–1861) and Susanna Sewell (1803–1888). He married Sarah Lucy Sharpe on 4 April 1865 at the Unitarian Chapel, Islington, London. Children from the marriage included:

- Sir William Julien Courtauld, 1st Baronet, JP (16 June 1870 - 1940)
- Sydney Renée Courtauld (1873–1962)
- Samuel Courtauld (27 May 1876 – 1 December 1947)
- Catharine Dowman, née Courtauld (1878–1972)
- John Sewell Courtauld, MC MP (30 August 1880 – 20 April 1942)
- Sir Stephen Lewis Courtauld, MC (27 February 1882 – 1967)

He was a Justice of the Peace for Essex. He built a house called Bocking Place in Braintree, Essex between 1885 and 1887. The architect was Ernest Flint. It was one of the first buildings in Essex equipped with electric lighting.

He was a horticulturalist and was the first person who managed to get the orchid Masdevallia costaricensis (now renamed Masdevallia marginella) to flower in England. He donated the Braintree and Bocking Public Gardens to the people of Braintree on 26 November 1888.

Sydney Courtauld died on 20 October 1899 in Gosfield, Essex.
