= Catharine Dowman =

Suffragist (1878–1972)

- Born: Catharine Courtauld; 25 May 1878; Bocking, Braintree, Essex, United Kingdom of Great Britain and Ireland
- Died: 19 September 1972 (aged 94); Weymouth, Dorset, United Kingdom of Great Britain and Northern Ireland
- Occupations: Philanthropist; Suffragette
- Known for: Restoration of the Cutty Sark
- Spouse: Captain Wilfred Harry Dowman (m. 1920; died 1936)
- Parent(s): Sydney Courtauld; Sarah Lucy Courtauld, née Sharpe
- Family: Courtauld Family

Catharine Dowman (née Courtauld; 25 May 1878 – 19 September 1972) was an English philanthropist associated with women's suffrage and the restoration of the Cutty Sark.

== Family ==
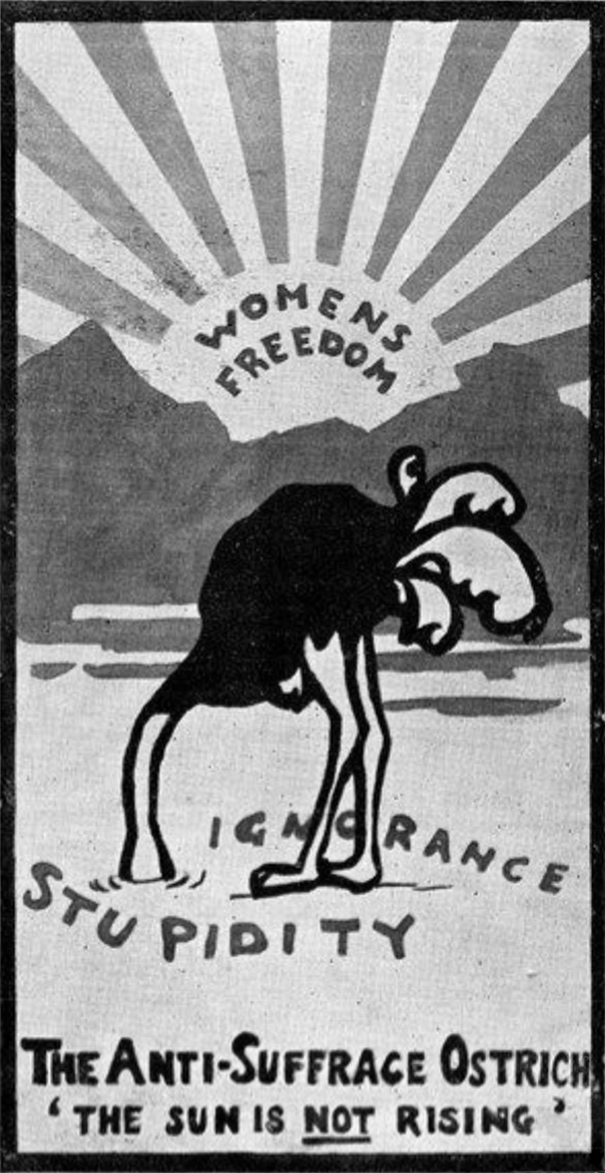
The Anti-suffrage Ostrich (1909 – c. 1914) by the Suffrage Atelier

Catharine was a member of the wealthy English Courtauld textile family. She was born in Bocking, Essex, the daughter of Sydney Courtauld (1840–1899) and Sarah Lucy Sharpe (1844–1906). Her older brother Samuel Courtauld founded the Courtauld Institute of Art.

In 1912, she met her future husband, Wilfred Harry Dowman, whilst a passenger sailing from London to Sydney on the Port Jackson, a cadet training ship. Wilfred was already married so they had to wait for his divorce before finally marrying in 1920.

== Philanthropic work ==
In January 1922, Wilfred saw the then Ferreira when she put into Falmouth to repair storm damage. Recognising her as the clipper ship Cutty Sark, he and Catherine strived to purchase her. They sold parts of their estate, along with other vessels including the brigantine Lady of Avenal. Their vision for the Cutty Sark was that she be used as a cadet training vessel.

Over the next two years, the Dowmans funded the restoration of the ship and by 1924 Cutty Sark was displayed as the flagship at the Fowey Regatta. For 16 years, the vessel was moored in Falmouth and was used to train cadets until Wilfred's death in 1936, which prompted her sale in 1938 to the Thames Nautical Training College. Catharine continued to follow the Cutty Sark, last visiting the ship in 1968 at the age of 90.

In 1934 the Dowmans moved to Wyke Regis, near Weymouth in Dorset. Catherine supported the local scouts, donating the land for the 3rd Wyke Regis / Weymouth South Scout Group headquarters, and being president of the group until her death in 1972.

== Women's suffrage ==
Catharine was a founder member of the Suffrage Atelier and the Artists' Suffrage League, and used her art for the cause. Her Suffrage Atelier posters were often witty – such as the 'Prehistoric Argument and the 'Anti-Suffrage Ostrich' – and were widely distributed as postcards.
