= William Courtauld =

British businessman and benefactor (1870 - 1940)

Sir William Courtauld Bt
- Born: William Julien Courtauld; 6 June 1870
- Died: 13 May 1940 (aged 69)
- Education: Trinity College, University of Cambridge
- Spouse: Constance Cecily Courtauld (m. 1913)
- Relatives: Sydney Courtauld (father); George Courtauld (father-in-law)
- Family: Courtauld Family

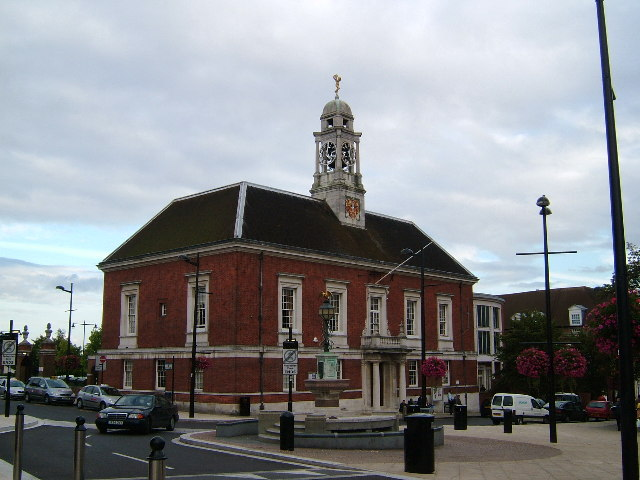
Braintree Town Hall

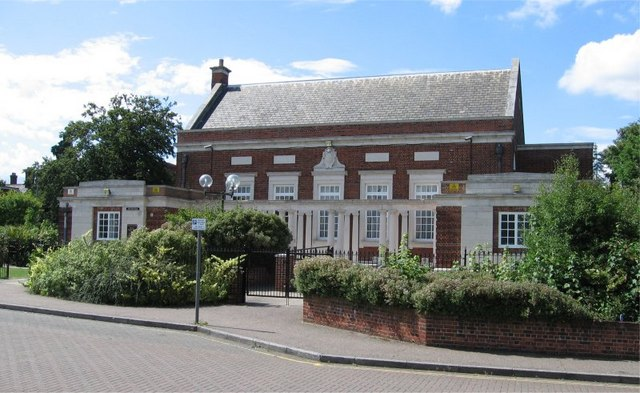
Braintree Register Office

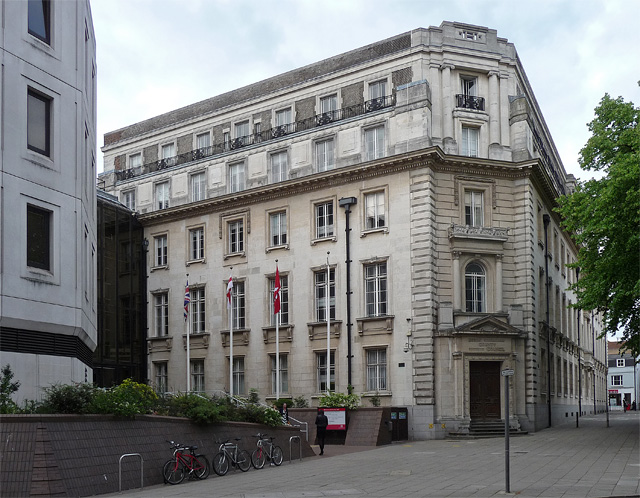
County Hall, Chelmsford

Sir William Julien Courtauld, 1st Baronet (6 June 1870 – 13 May 1940) was a British businessman and benefactor and a member of the Courtauld family empire in Great Britain.

== Background ==
Courtauld was the son of Sydney Courtauld and Sarah Lucy Sharpe. He was educated at Rugby and at Trinity College, Cambridge.

== Public life ==
Courtauld was chairman of the Education Committee for Braintree area, and a member of the Essex Education Committee. He represented Braintree division on the Essex County Council, and was chairman of the Braintree Bench. He was a Deputy Chairman of Essex Quarter Sessions from 1921 to 1928, and Chairman from 1928 to 1936. He was a General Commissioner of Income Tax from 1908 until his death. In 1921, Courtauld was appointed the High Sheriff of Essex for the year.

Courtauld was a considerable benefactor towards his local community. His gifts include the following:

Braintree:

- William Julien Courtauld Hospital
- recreation ground
- fountain
- buildings near the church
- Braintree Town Hall: built between 1926 and 1928.
- Register Office: given in 1929.

Chelmsford:

- the new County Hall: given in 1938.

In recognition of his status as a senior member of this prominent and socially active business family, and of his personal record of charitable works, he was created a baronet, of Bocking in the County of Essex, on 5 July 1939. As he had no children, it was understood that he would be not only the first, but probably also the last, holder of the title.

== Personal life ==
Courtauld married his cousin Constance Cecily Courtauld, daughter of George Courtauld, on 23 January 1913 in Gosfield, Essex. He died in May 1940, aged 69, when the Courtauld baronetcy became extinct.

Baronetage of the United Kingdom
New creation	Baronet (of Bocking); 1939–1940	Extinct
