= Stephen Courtauld =

British businessman (1883–1967)

Sir Stephen Courtauld MC FRGS
- Born: Stephen Lewis Courtauld; 27 February 1883; Bocking, Braintree, Essex, United Kingdom of Great Britain and Ireland
- Died: 9 October 1967 (aged 84); Salisbury (now, Harare), Rhodesia (now, Zimbabwe)
- Education: Rugby School; King's College, Cambridge
- Occupation: Philanthropist
- Spouse(s): Lady Virginia Courtauld, née Peirano (m. 1923)
- Parent(s): Sydney Courtauld; Sarah Lucy Courtauld, née Sharpe
- Family: Courtauld Family
- Military career
- Allegiance: United Kingdom
- Branch: British Army
- Service years: 1914–1918
- Units: Artists' Rifles; Worcestershire Regiment; Machine Gun Corps
- Conflicts: World War I
- Awards: Mentioned in dispatches; Military Cross

Sir Stephen Lewis Courtauld MC FRGS (27 February 1883 – 9 October 1967) was an English philanthropist associated with geographical exploration, the restoration of Eltham Palace in south-east London, and cultural and education causes, both in the UK and in Southern Rhodesia (now Zimbabwe), where he and his wife Virginia also donated to organisations promoting racial equality.

== Family, education and military service ==
Courtauld was a member of the wealthy English Courtauld textile family. He was born in Bocking, Essex, the son of Sydney Courtauld (10 March 1840 – 20 October 1899) and Sarah Lucy Sharpe (1844–1906) and youngest brother of Samuel Courtauld, founder of the Courtauld Institute of Art. He was educated at Rugby and King's College, Cambridge. He did not enter the family business but his wealthy background enabled him to travel extensively and to pursue cultural and philanthropic interests.

Serving in the Artists' Rifles, Worcestershire Regiment and the Machine Gun Corps during World War I, he was twice mentioned in despatches and awarded the Military Cross in 1918. After the war, in 1919, as an enthusiastic mountaineer, he completed the first ascent of the Innominata face of Mont Blanc in the French Alps. Also in 1919, he met his future wife, Countess Virginia Spinola (née Peirano) (c. 1883–1972), whom he married on 20 August 1923 at Fiume (then in Italy, now Rijeka, Croatia). In the month of their marriage artist Percy Metcalfe was commissioned to strike medals featuring busts of the couple and these are now held in the British Museum collection.

== Philanthropic work ==
Courtauld became a Fellow of the Royal Geographical Society in 1920. He later became a member of the Council and was Vice President of the Society (1944–1946). He was chairman of the committee to raise the necessary funds to equip the British Arctic Air Route Expedition (1930–1931), led by Gino Watkins. Courtauld's first cousin Augustine Courtauld was a member both of the committee and of the expedition.

He funded construction of an ice rink in Westminster, the London Ice Club, which opened on 13 January 1927. World War II forced the club's closure in 1940.

Courtauld collaborated with Basil Dean and Reginald Baker and made a substantial financial contribution to the construction and development of Ealing Studios. At the opening of two large sound stages in December 1931, providing facilities for 12 film productions a year, the ribbon-cutting ceremony was performed jointly by Virginia Courtauld and actress Gracie Fields. Courtauld was subsequently chairman of the Ealing Studios group of companies for 20 years and was instrumental in the appointment of Michael Balcon to take charge of the production programme in 1938. He was a trustee of the Royal Opera House in London's Covent Garden, and provided financial support for the Courtauld Galleries in Cambridge's Fitzwilliam Museum. He funded a Scholarship for the Art of Engraving at the British School at Rome.

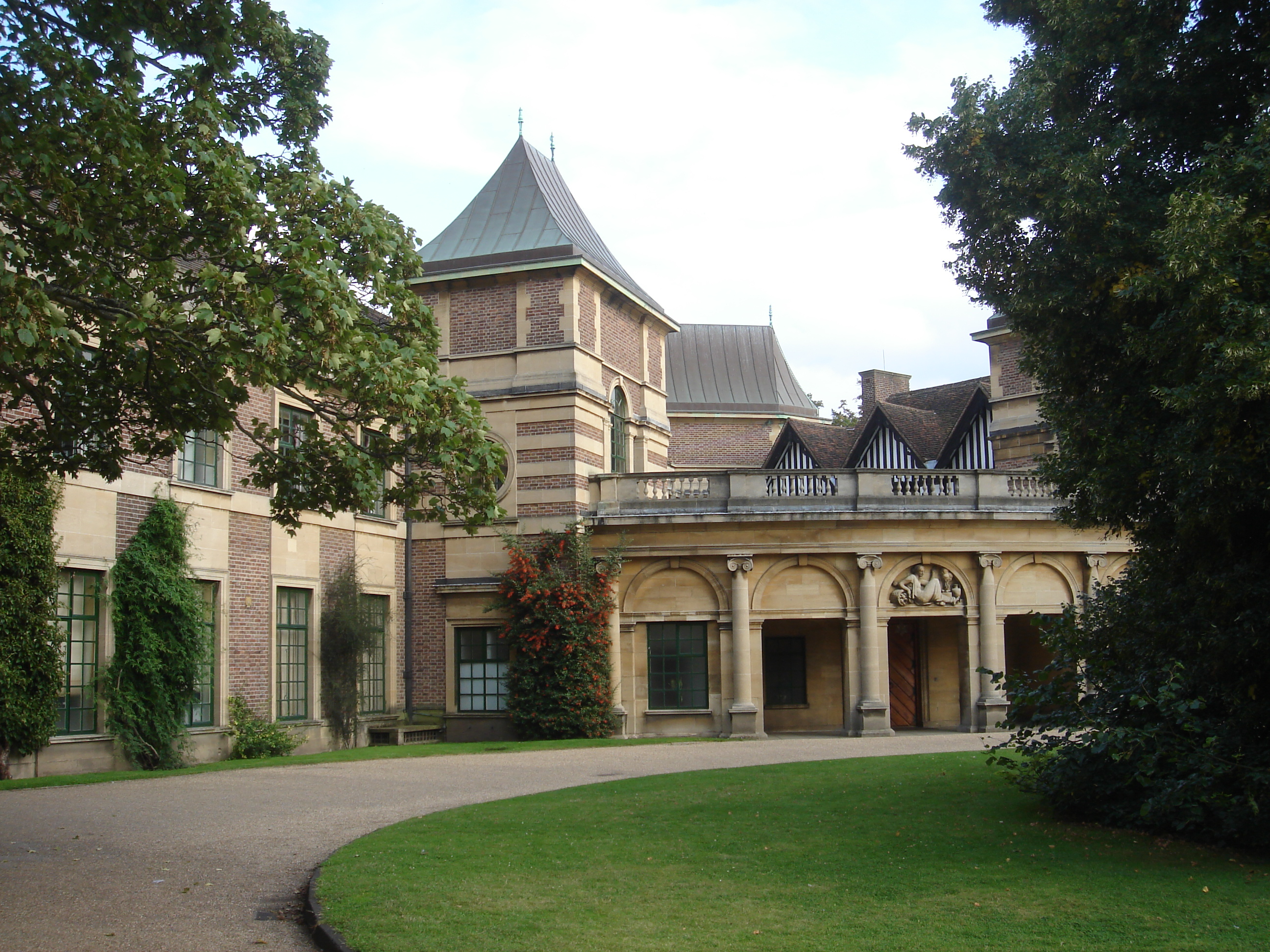
Eltham Palace

He undertook the redevelopment of Eltham Palace in Eltham, south-east London with his wife Virginia during the 1930s. They employed architects John Seely and Paul Paget and fashionable Mayfair interior designer the Marchese Peter Malacrida (1889–1980) to design a new private house in the Art Deco style to adjoin the existing Palace building, which was extensively restored. Malacrida also designed the interiors of the Courtauld's 712-ton luxury yacht, Virginia (launched in 1930 at Dalmuir on the Upper Clyde in Scotland).

Later in the Second World War, the Courtaulds left Eltham Palace in May 1944 to live in Muckairn, Taynuilt, Scotland, as the site was on one of the Luftwaffe bombing paths towards London and was subjected to some direct hits.

== The Rhodesia years ==
In 1951, they moved again, to Southern Rhodesia, now Zimbabwe. They established a home at Penhalonga, near Mutare. The estate was named La Rochelle after the place of origin of his family. There they established an extensive botanic garden designed by an Italian landscape artist. The Lady Virginia Orchid is named after Lady Courtauld. The couple became Rhodesian citizens on 16 June 1954.

Courtauld was a very active philanthropist in Southern Rhodesia. His achievements included the funding of the construction of buildings for the Courtauld Theatre and Queen's Hall in Mutare. An obituary noted that "liberal in thought and open minded in his relations with people, it is said that when the question arose of racial segregation in his theatre he made it clear he would pull the building down before agreeing to such a measure." Stephen and Virginia Courtauld were leading donors to the Capricorn Africa Society, led by David Stirling, which promoted democratic and multi-racial development in East and Central Africa. He built a multi-racial residential club, the Rhodes Club (1961), in Mutare, and founded and endowed the Kukwanisa Farm School in Nyanga for African boys in 1964.

Stephen Courtauld was chairman of the board of trustees of the Rhodes National Gallery (now the National Gallery of Zimbabwe), which opened in 1957. An enthusiastic supporter, he contributed to the construction costs and provided a substantial endowment fund for the Gallery. He bequeathed 93 works of art to the gallery, including works by Rembrandt, Goya, Hogarth and Pissarro. These works are not on display in the gallery and their whereabouts has been described as a "mystery." He also funded construction of the auditorium of what is now the Zimbabwe College of Music in Harare.

He was knighted in the 1958 New Year Honours.

Sir Stephen died in Salisbury in 1967, following the amputation of his second leg. Virginia moved to Jersey in 1970 where she died in 1972. The La Rochelle estate was bequeathed to the National Trust of Rhodesia (now the National Trust of Zimbabwe) in 1970.

== Published works ==
- The Huguenot Family of Courtauld. [The author], privately printed. 1957.
