= Samuel Courtauld (art collector) =

English industrialist and art collector (1876–1947)

- Born: 7 May 1876
- Died: 1 December 1947 (aged 71)
- Education: Rugby School
- Occupations: Industrialist; Art collector
- Known for: Founder of the Courtauld Institute of Art
- Spouse: Elizabeth Theresa Frances Kelsey
- Parents: Sydney Courtauld; Sarah Lucy Courtauld, née Sharpe
- Relatives: Rab Butler (son-in-law); Richard C. Butler (grandson); Adam Butler (grandson)
- Family: Courtauld Family

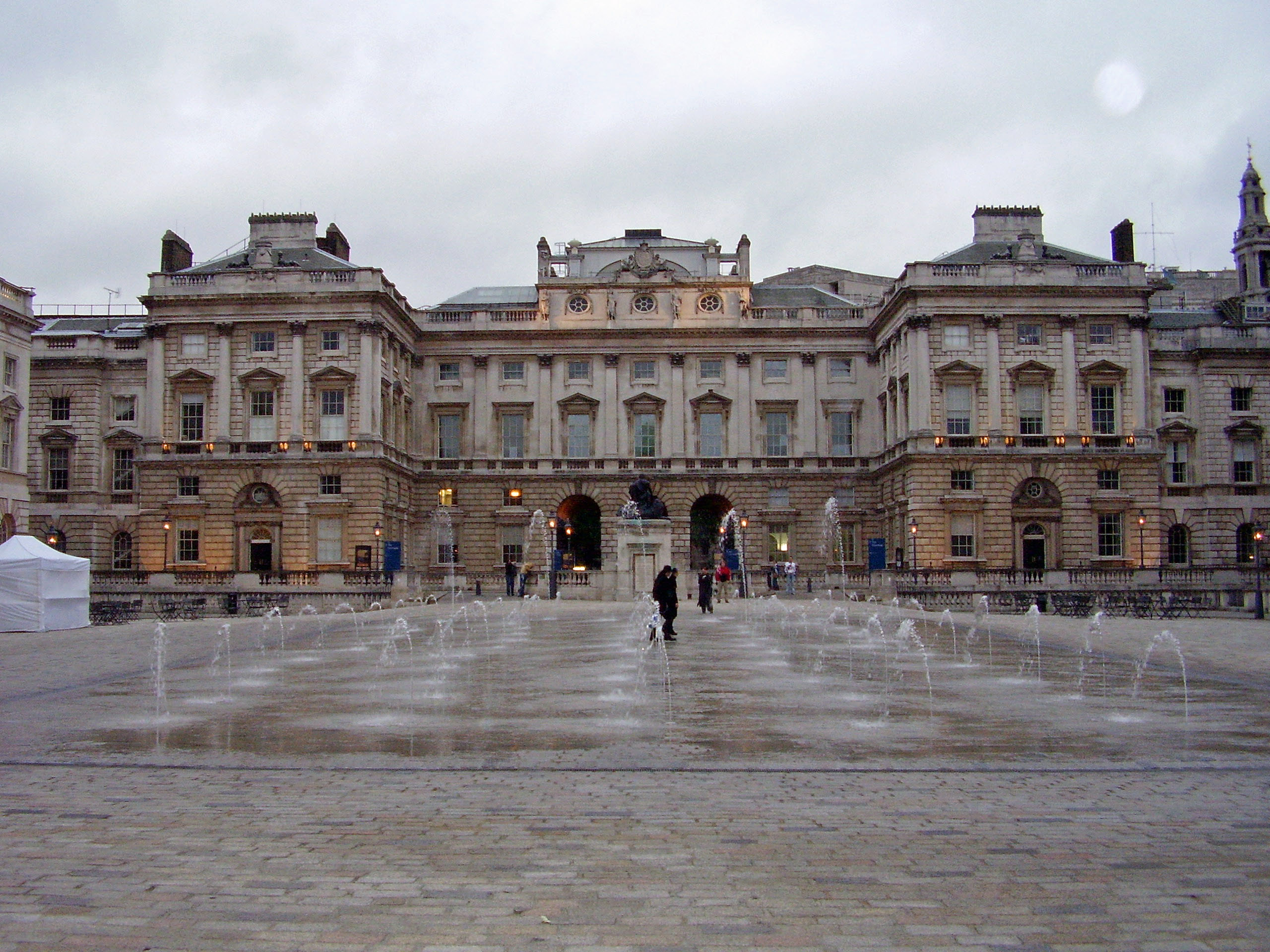
The Strand block of Somerset House, designed by William Chambers from 1775 to 1780, has housed the Courtauld Institute of Art since 1989.

Samuel Courtauld (7 May 1876 – 1 December 1947) was an English industrialist who is best remembered as an art collector. He founded the Courtauld Institute of Art in London in 1932 and, after a series of gifts during the 1930s, bequeathed his collection to the institute on his death.

By the early 20th century, the Courtauld family business had become a major international company, having successfully developed and marketed rayon, an artificial fibre and inexpensive silk substitute. Samuel Courtauld took charge of the firm from 1908 as director and as chairman from 1921 to 1946.

== Personal life ==
Courtauld was the son of Sydney Courtauld (1840–1899) and Sarah Lucy Sharpe (1844–1906) of Stanstead Hall, and the great-nephew of textile magnate Samuel Courtauld. He was educated at Rugby School. After he finished school, he visited Germany and France and studied textile technology to prepare to work in the family business. In 1901, he became director of one of the factories (in Halstead, Essex), then in 1908 the CEO of all plants of the company.

He became interested in art after seeing the Hugh Lane collection on exhibition at the Tate Gallery in 1917. However, his career as a collector started in 1922 following an exhibition of French art at the Burlington Fine Arts Club. Courtauld was one of the first British collectors to display interest in French Impressionist and Post-Impressionist paintings. During the 1920s, he assembled an extensive collection including works by Vincent van Gogh (Self-Portrait with Bandaged Ear and Peach Blossom in the Crau, previously owned by Anna Boch), Édouard Manet (A Bar at the Folies-Bergère), Paul Cézanne (Montagne Sainte-Victoire) and Pierre-Auguste Renoir (La Loge). The core elements of his collection were acquired between 1926 and 1930, though his interest diminished following the death of his wife Elizabeth (known as Lil) in 1931. Samuel founded the Courtauld Institute of Art with Viscount Lee of Fareham and Sir Robert Witt in 1930.

Courtauld provided the bulk of the finances for the founding of the Courtauld Institute of Art. His wealth came from the textile business, but on both sides of his family there were connections with the arts and traditions of patronage going back several generations. Courtauld had an interest in paintings and wrote poems about them. On the advice of Roger Fry and others, he bought French Impressionists and Cézannes and took out a lease on the best Robert Adam house in London, Home House, 20 Portman Square, in which to display them—a novel combination. His example was emulated by his younger brother Stephen, who converted the medieval ruins of Eltham Palace into an Art Deco mansion. Samuel Courtauld was the main patron of the trio, and when his wife died in 1931, he transferred the house in Portman Square, together with the pictures, for the use of the new institute until such time as permanent accommodation could be found. In the event, the Portman Square house was to be the institute's home for almost sixty years.

Courtauld also created a £50,000 acquisition fund for the Tate and National Gallery in London, helping lay the foundations of national collections of Impressionist and Post-Impressionist art.

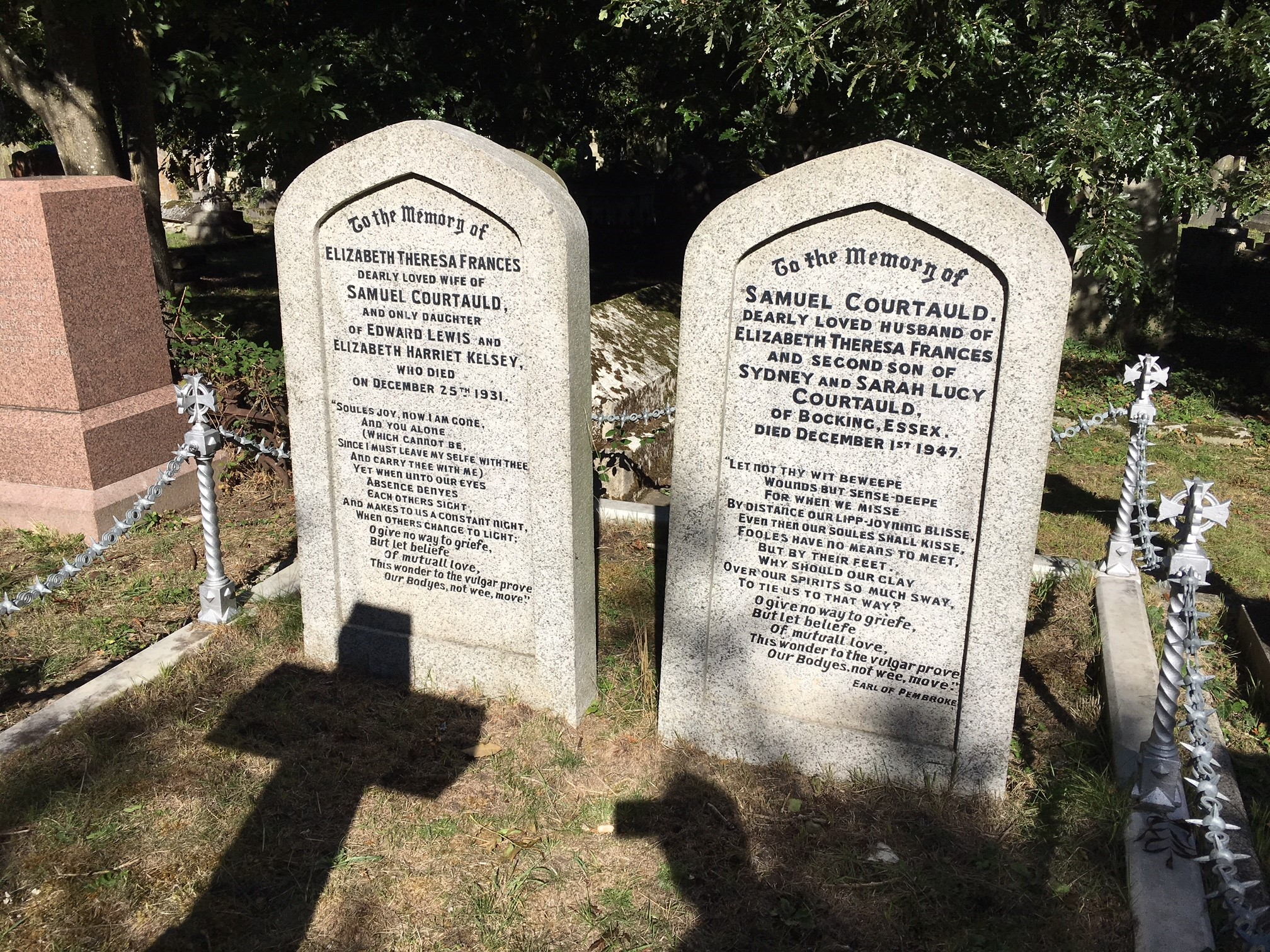
The graves of Samuel and Elizabeth Courtauld in Margate Cemetery, Kent

He declined a peerage in 1937.

== Family ==
Samuel Courtauld married Elizabeth Theresa Frances Kelsey on 20 June 1901. The children from this marriage included Sydney Elizabeth Courtauld (1902–1954), who married the politician Rab Butler and was the mother of Richard C. Butler and Adam Butler.

Samuel's younger brother, Stephen Courtauld, was also an arts patron and is remembered for his work on restoring Eltham Palace. Samuel's cousin, Augustine Courtauld (1904–1959), was an explorer, noted for his pioneering observations of the climate of the ice cap of Greenland.

== References and sources ==
Sources

- Turner, Jane (1996). The Dictionary of Art. Grove. p. 62. ISBN 1-884446-00-0.

Further reading

- The Courtauld Collection. A catalogue and introduction by Douglas Cooper. With a memoir of Samuel Courtauld by Anthony Blunt. University of London: The Athlone Press. 1954.
- Salmon, Dimitri (2019). Percy Moore Turner: précieux conseiller de Samuel & Elisabeth Courtauld. Fondation Louis Vuitton (Paris).
