= List of libraries in India =

This is a list of libraries in India.

== List ==
Name	City/Town	State	Year of establishment
Smt. Hansa Mehta Library	Vadodara	Gujarat	1950
Gowtami Grandhalayam	Rajahmundry	Andhra Pradesh	1898
Saraswata Niketanam	Vetapalem	Andhra Pradesh	1918
Visakhapatnam Public Library	Visakhapatnam	Andhra Pradesh	1996
Bihar Hitaishi District Central Library	Patna	Bihar	1882
Khuda Bakhsh Oriental Library	Patna	Bihar	1842
Maharaja Harendra Kishore Public Library	Bettiah	Bihar	1905
Sinha Library	Patna	Bihar	1924
Panjab Digital Library	Chandigarh	Chandigarh	2003
American Library	Delhi	Delhi	1951
Central library, IIT Delhi	Delhi	Delhi	1988
Delhi Public Library	Delhi	Delhi	1951
Dr. Vijay Pal Memorial Library	Delhi	Delhi	1975
National Medical Library	Delhi	Delhi	1966
Nehru Memorial Museum & Library	Delhi	Delhi	1966
Goa State Central Library	Panaji	Goa	1832
Goa University Library	Taleigão	Goa	1985
Bookworm Children's Library	Taleigão	Goa	2004
Dr Francisco Luis Gomes District Library	Margao	Goa	2010
Andrews Library	Surat	Gujarat	1850
Kavi Narmad Central Library	Surat	Gujarat	1991
Library of Tibetan Works and Archives	Dharamshala	Himachal Pradesh	1970
Mysore University Library	Mysuru	Karnataka	1918
Eloor Lending Library Ernakulam	Kochi	Kerala	1979
Ernakulam Public Library	Kochi	Kerala	1870
Kollam Public Library	Kollam	Kerala	1973
State Central Library	Thiruvananthapuram	Kerala	1829
Thrissur Public Library	Thrissur	Kerala	1872
Maulana Azad Central Library	Bhopal	Madhya Pradesh	1908
Asiatic Society of Mumbai	Mumbai	Maharashtra	1804
Central Library, IIT Bombay	Mumbai	Maharashtra	1958
David Sassoon Library	Mumbai	Maharashtra	1990
J. N. Petit Library	Mumbai	Maharashtra	1898
Marathi Granth Sangrahalaya	Thane	Maharashtra	1893
Mumbai Marathi Grantha Sangrahalaya	Mumbai	Maharashtra	1898
University of Mumbai Library	Mumbai	Maharashtra	1880
Nagaland State Library	Kohima	Nagaland	1981
Harekrushna Mahtab State Library	Bhubaneswar	Odisha	1959
Romain Rolland Library	Pondicherry	Puducherry	1827
Bhadariya Library	Jaisalmer	Rajasthan	1998
Prakrit Bharati Academy	Jaipur	Rajasthan	1977
University of Rajasthan Library	Jaipur	Rajasthan	1949
Saraswathi Mahal Library	Tanjore	Tamil Nadu	1535
Adyar Library	Chennai	Tamil Nadu	1886
Anna Centenary Library	Chennai	Tamil Nadu	2010
Connemara Public Library	Chennai	Tamil Nadu	1890
Daniel Poor Memorial	Madurai	Tamil Nadu	1915
Mahakavi Bharathi Memorial Library	Erode	Tamil Nadu	1921
Roja Muthiah Research Library	Chennai	Tamil Nadu	1994
Sivagurunathan Tamil Library	Kumbakonam	Tamil Nadu	1958
State Central Library	Hyderabad	Telangana	1891
Sri Krishna Devaraya Andhra Bhasha Nilayam	Hyderabad	Telangana	1901
City Central Library	Hyderabad	Telangana	1960
British Library	Hyderabad	Telangana	1979
Amir-ud-daula Public Library	Lucknow	Uttar Pradesh	1868
Bharati Bhavan Library	Allahabad	Uttar Pradesh	1889
Raza Library	Rampur	Uttar Pradesh	1774
Allahabad Public Library	Allahabad	Uttar Pradesh	1864
Maulana Azad Library	Aligarh	Uttar Pradesh	1877
Sayaji Rao Gaekwad Library	Varanasi	Uttar Pradesh	1917
National Library of India	Kolkata	West Bengal	1836
North Bengal State Library	Cooch Behar	West Bengal	1882
Progressive Cultural Club & Public Library, Changayilkonam	Changayilkonam	Kerala	2020

== See also ==
- List of libraries in Goa
- List of libraries in Hyderabad
- List of library associations in India
- Open access in India
- List of library consortia in India
