= List of libraries in Hyderabad =

Libraries in Hyderabad, Telangana, India, include:

- Archaeological Museum Library is located at Gunfundry, Opposite Lepakshi, Near Abids.
- British Library is established in 1979 and located at Rd No. 36 Jubilee Hills.
- City Central Library established in 1960 is located at Chikkadpally.
- Indo American Studies Centre for International Studies is located at Osmania University Campus.
- Osmania University Library is located at Osmania University campus.
- Children's Library at Kea Brainery is located at Himayathnagar Street No 18
- Jawaharlal Nehru Technological University Library is located at JNTU Hyderabad campus.
- State Central Library is located at Afzal Gunj is established in 1891 by Nawab Imad-ul-Mulk. It was formerly known as Asafia Library.
- Vivekananda Library is located at RamaKrishna Math campus, Domalguda.
- National Institute of Micro, Small and Medium Enterprises Library is located at NI-MSME campus at Yusufguda, Hyderabad is one of the exhaustive and reputed libraries in the city.
- Elite Library for competitive exams in tarnaka, secunderabad
- Sri Krishna Devaraya Andhra Bhasha Nilayam is perhaps the oldest non-Government Library in the State of Andhra Pradesh established in 1901.
- Sundarayya Vignana Kendram is established in 1988 and located at Baglingampally.
- Telugu University Library located at the NCC end of Osmania University Campus
- Idara E Adabiyat E Urdu Library located at Aiwan-e-Urdu, Panjagutta established in 1945.
- Sundarayya Vijnana Kendram, Gachibowli.

== See also ==
- List of libraries in India
