= Dr. Vijay Pal Memorial Library =

- Location: Plot No. 8, Local Shopping Centre, Block C-7, Keshav Puram, Delhi-110035, India
- Type: Public library
- Established: 1975
- Branches: 2

Other information
- Website: www.vpml.in

Dr. Vijay Pal Memorial Libraries are run by the Dr. Vijay Pal Memorial Society, which is a charitable institution, registered under the Societies Registration Act and the Income Tax Act. The society runs two public libraries - a general library & a reference library. Both the libraries are open to all sections of the society.

== History ==
The General Library was started in the year 1975, and readers of all age groups make use of this library. The general library is situated on the first floor of the Community Hall in Block C-7, Keshav Puram, Delhi. This library comprises a reading room and a library.

The Reference Library was started on 11 April 1993. This air-conditioned library is located at plot No. 8, Local Shopping Centre, Block C-7, Keshav Puram, Delhi-110035. The seating capacity is about 450 readers. The library opens from 7.30 am to 9.30 pm on all days of the week. The readers are mostly the students appearing for competitive and professional examinations like Indian Administrative Service, IPC, Chartered Accountants, Engineering, Company Secretaryship, Cost Accountancy, Medicine, Banking, etc., and also college students. They come from different parts of the North Delhi, West Delhi and even from other far-flung areas. The readers are provided with books for reference in the library itself.but most of them are for staff selection commission.
