= Maulana Azad Central Library =

Library in Bhopal, Madhya Pradesh, India

- 23.25834°N 77.40935°E
- Location: Bhopal, Madhya Pradesh, India

Other information
- Website: official website

The Maulana Azad Central Library is a public library located in Bhopal, Madhya Pradesh, India. Established in 1908 by Sultan Jahan Begum, the then Nawab of Bhopal, the library was originally known as the Edward Museum. In 1955, it was renamed in honor of Maulana Abul Kalam Azad, India's first Minister of Education. The library is housed in a red sandstone structure, exemplifying early 20th-century Indo-Islamic architecture, and was declared a protected monument under the Archaeological Sites and Remains Act in 2012.

== History ==
The building that now houses the Maulana Azad Central Library was constructed in 1908 to serve as the Edward Museum, intended to display gifts and artifacts received by the Bhopal royal family. The museum was inaugurated in 1909 by Lord Minto, the then Viceroy of India. In 1955, the structure was repurposed as a public library and named after Maulana Abul Kalam Azad.

== Collections ==
The library boasts a collection of over 100,000 books and manuscripts in multiple languages, including Hindi, English, Urdu, Persian, Arabic, and Sanskrit. It houses rare texts, some over a century old, and serves as a repository of knowledge on various subjects such as literature, science, history, and culture.

== Facilities and services ==
To cater to the needs of students and researchers, the library offers several facilities:

Reading Halls: Three main reading halls accommodate approximately 600 students daily.

Study Cabins: 32 cabin-style study rooms have been developed to provide individual study spaces.

Digital Access: The library has initiated the digitization of its collection, allowing users to access materials online. The Times of India

Braille Section: A dedicated section for visually impaired readers includes Braille books and resources.

Wi-Fi Connectivity: Free Wi-Fi is available to facilitate digital learning and research.

Seminars and Workshops: The library regularly organizes seminars, interactive sessions, and workshops to engage the academic community.
