= Bhadariya Library =

Underground library in India

- 27.098325202802812°N 71.55673160533176°E
- Location: Bhadariya, Rajasthan, India

Bhadariya Library is a library building based in Jaisalmer, in the Indian state of Rajasthan. It is situated at Bhadariya Village in Pokharan Tahesil under the Thar desert and has sitting capacity of 4000 persons.

== History ==
The library was developed Harbansh Singh Nirmal -- also known as Bhadariya Maharaj -- an avid reader from Punjab. In 1998, he started collecting books gifted to him by people. Later on, funds were raised to construct a temple for a goddess here.

== Construction ==
It is an underground library set up 16 feet (4.9 m) under ground beneath a temple. This helps keeping library cool even in the humid summer. The bibliotheca consists of 562 glass shelves. the library is being looked after by the villagers and the temple devotees through a trust named Jagdamba Seva Committee.

== Collection ==
The library hosts more than 900,000 books. The books present in the library range from science and astronomy to astrology and history. Most of the books here are in Hindi pertaining to archaic Indian texts, and scriptures.
