= Keshav Puram =

Neighborhood in North West Delhi, India

- Neighborhood
- Location in Delhi, India
- Coordinates: 28.6889°N 77.1616°E
- Country: India
- State: Delhi
- District: North West Delhi
- Time zone: UTC+5:30 (IST)
- PIN: 110035
- Civic agency: North Delhi Municipal Corporation

Keshav Puram is a locality in the northwest district of Delhi, India. It was first developed by the Delhi Development Authority. The area has a lot of parks and the pollution levels are low. The number of people living there is also low.

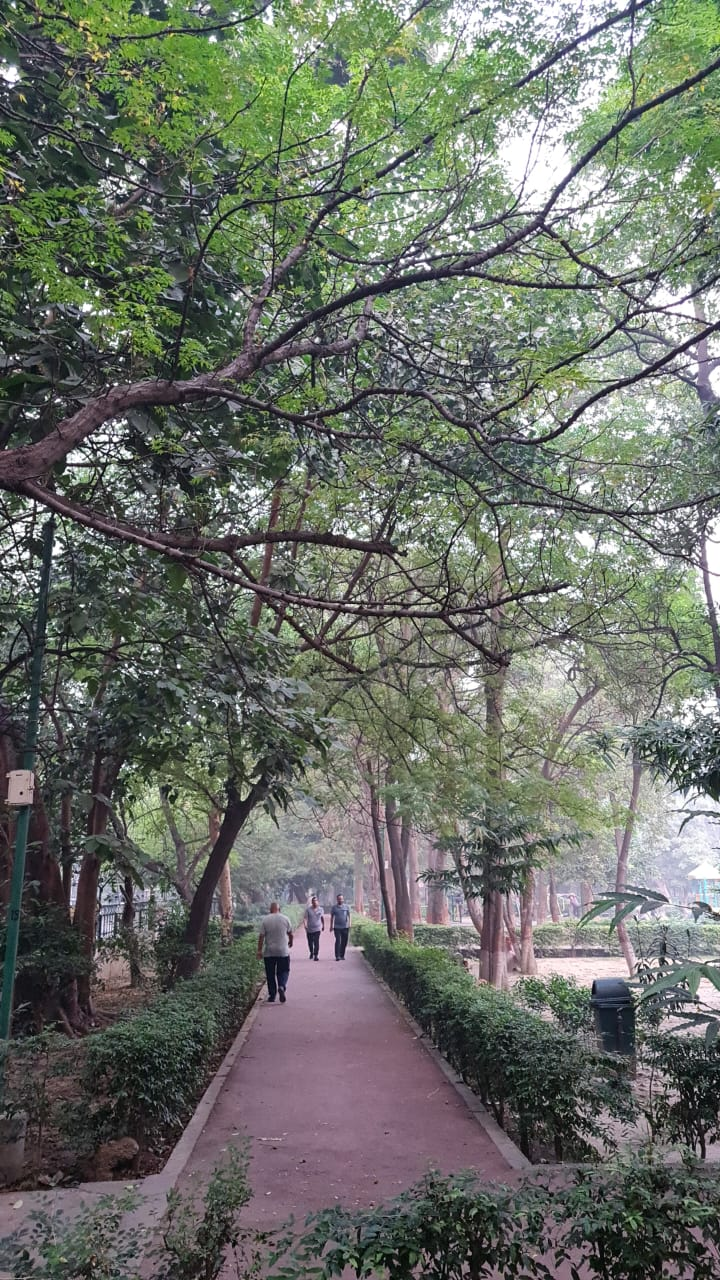

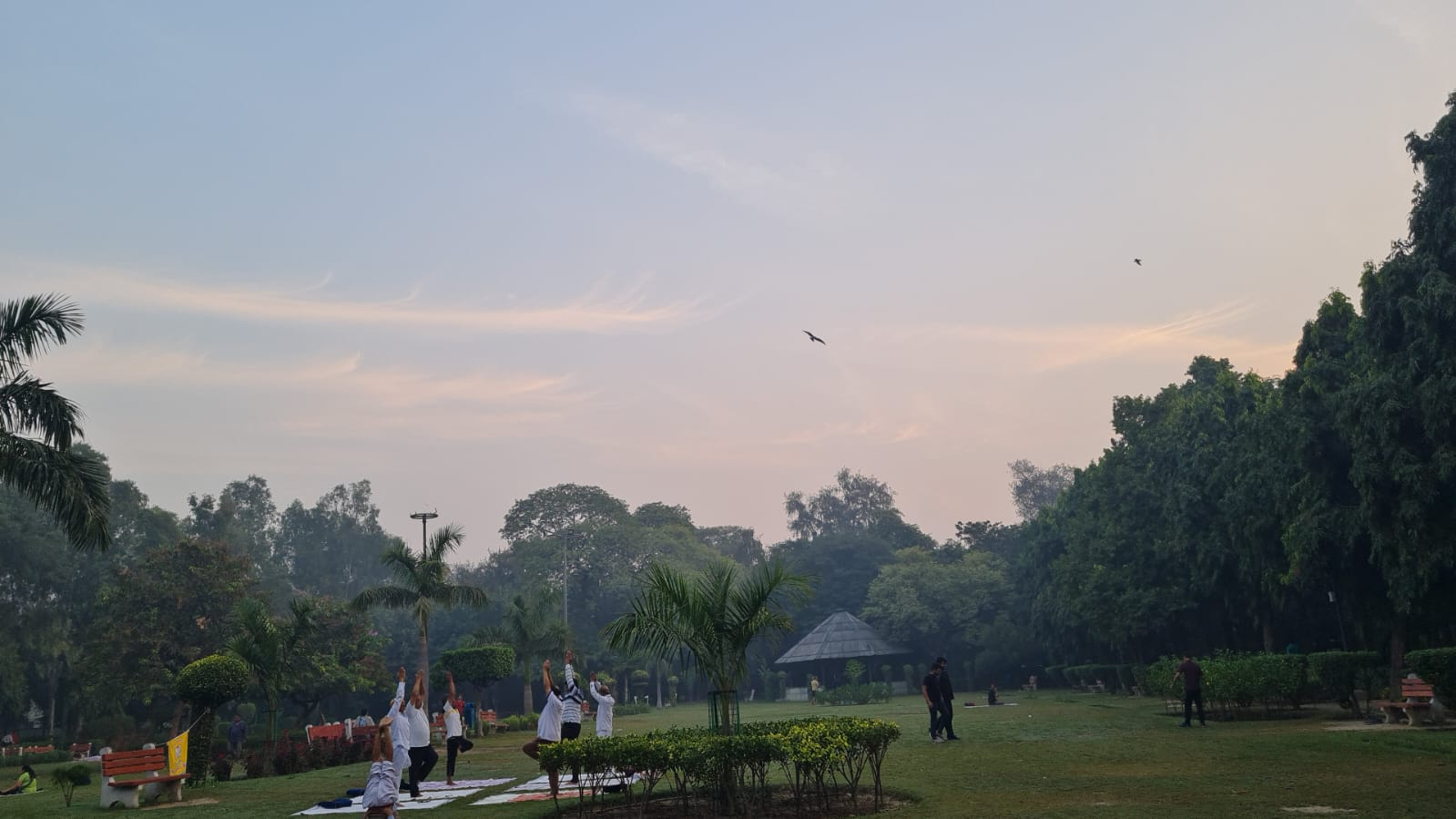

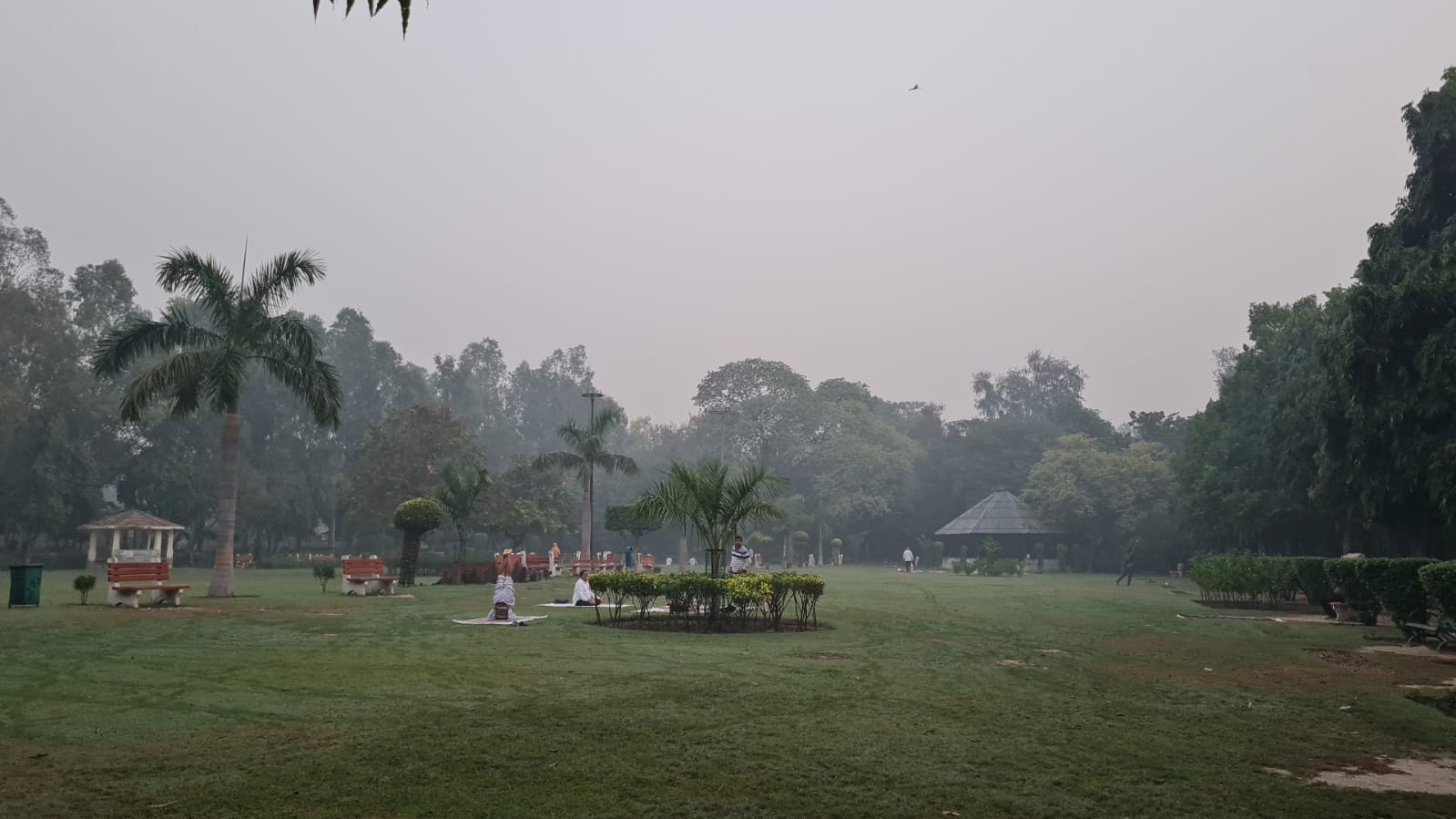

== Administration and politics ==
Keshav Puram is in the constituency represented by MLA Ms. Poonam Sharma of the Bharatiya Janta Party. The area falls under the Wazirpur jurisdiction (No.17) of Delhi. Keshav Puram falls under the Chandni Chowk Constituency, presently represented in the Lok Sabha by Praveen Khandelwal, BJP. It is a ward of the Municipal Corporation of Delhi. The constituent blocks of Keshav Puram are all represented by Resident Welfare Associations.

After the delimitation of assembly constituencies, Keshav Puram now falls under the Wazirpur assembly constituency.

== Transport ==
The Keshav Puram Metro station lies on the Red Line and was opened in 2004. Feeder bus services operate from other Metro stations, such as Netaji Subhash Place

This area is also served by Metro Green Line (Ashok Park Main Metro Starion) and Pink Line (Shakurpur Metro Station) which are nearby.

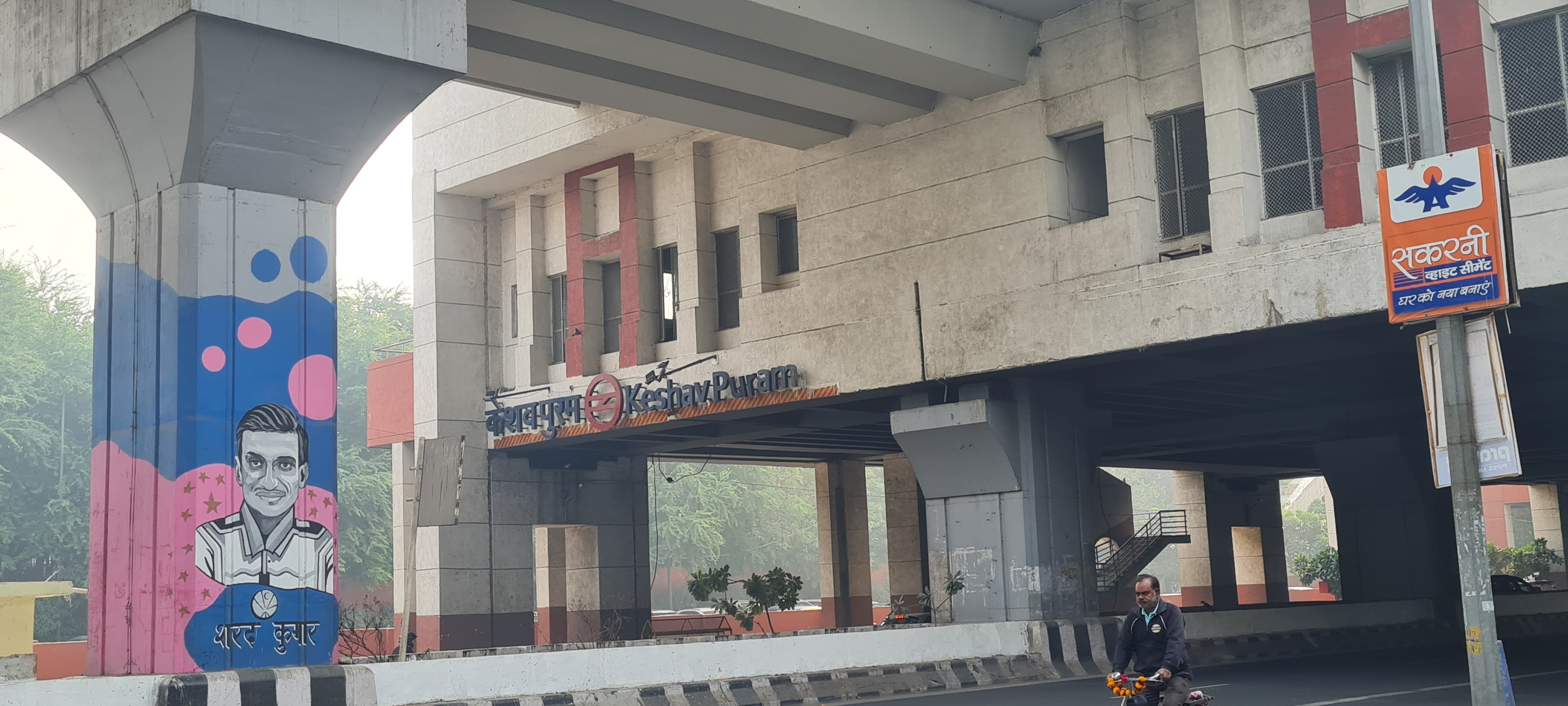

Underpass linking the Ring Road & Keshav Puram is now functional. It is connected to the Ring Road also through the Wazirpur Depot (known as Netaji Subhash Place). Sarai Rohilla and Shakurbasti are the two nearestest railway station to Keshav Puram.

== Educational institutions ==
- Government Boys Senior Secondary School
- Government Sarvodaya Kanya Vidyalaya No.1
- Mata Shiv Devi Public School
- Tyagi Public School
- Kendriya Vidyalaya, Keshav Puram
- District Institute of Education and Training which is for teacher training for primary teachers.
- Campus of open learning University of Delhi

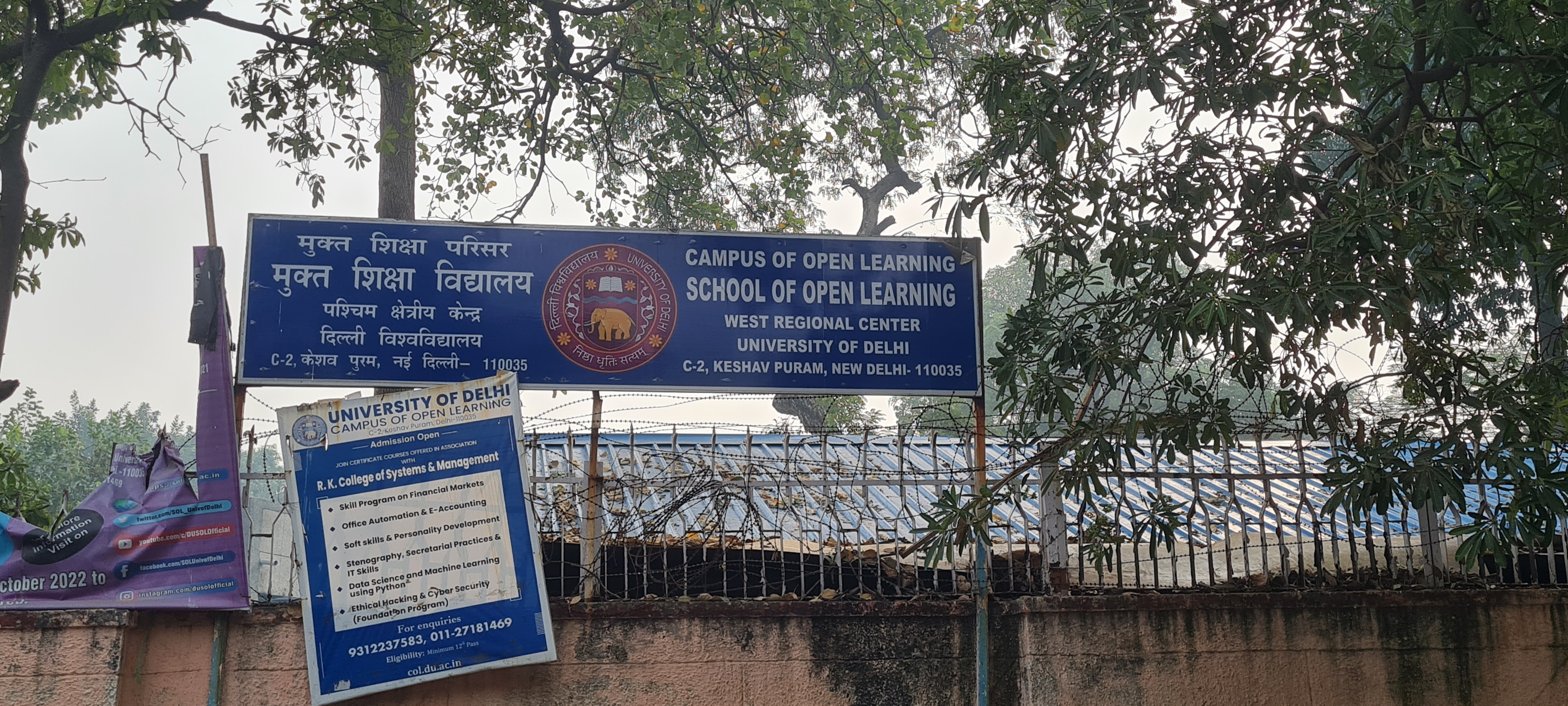

== Hospitals ==
Apart from several private clinics and medical consultancies, there are several hospitals in and around the neighborhood. These are listed below:

- Delhi Government Dispensary
- Deenbandhu Chottu Ram Dispensary (also offers homeopathic treatments)

== Industry ==
Industry in Keshav Puram includes meat warehousing, and plastics fibre-glass production, and food production. A notable company in Keshav Puram is Britannia Industries. Previously Keshav Puram was also the site for Kwality, a producer of frozen desserts. The area has many cold storage facilities.

== Sports and recreation ==
The Keshav Puram Cricket Club plays in the President’s Estate Friendship Challenge League. Healthways has a swimming pool and a fitness centre. Keshav Puram has many parks, including the Mazdoor Park (also referred as Hathoda Ram Park for a statue depicting a laborer wielding a large hathoda i.e. hammer). There is also a fitness center in one of the parks near Keshav Puram Subzi Mandi. The Dhyan Chand sports complex houses facilities for many sports, such as swimming and tennis, and is located in neighboring Ashok Vihar. Behind Hathoda park there is a stadium with the name Rani Jhansi Stadium. Besides this stadium there is a swimming pool and also a fitness centre (Zym)

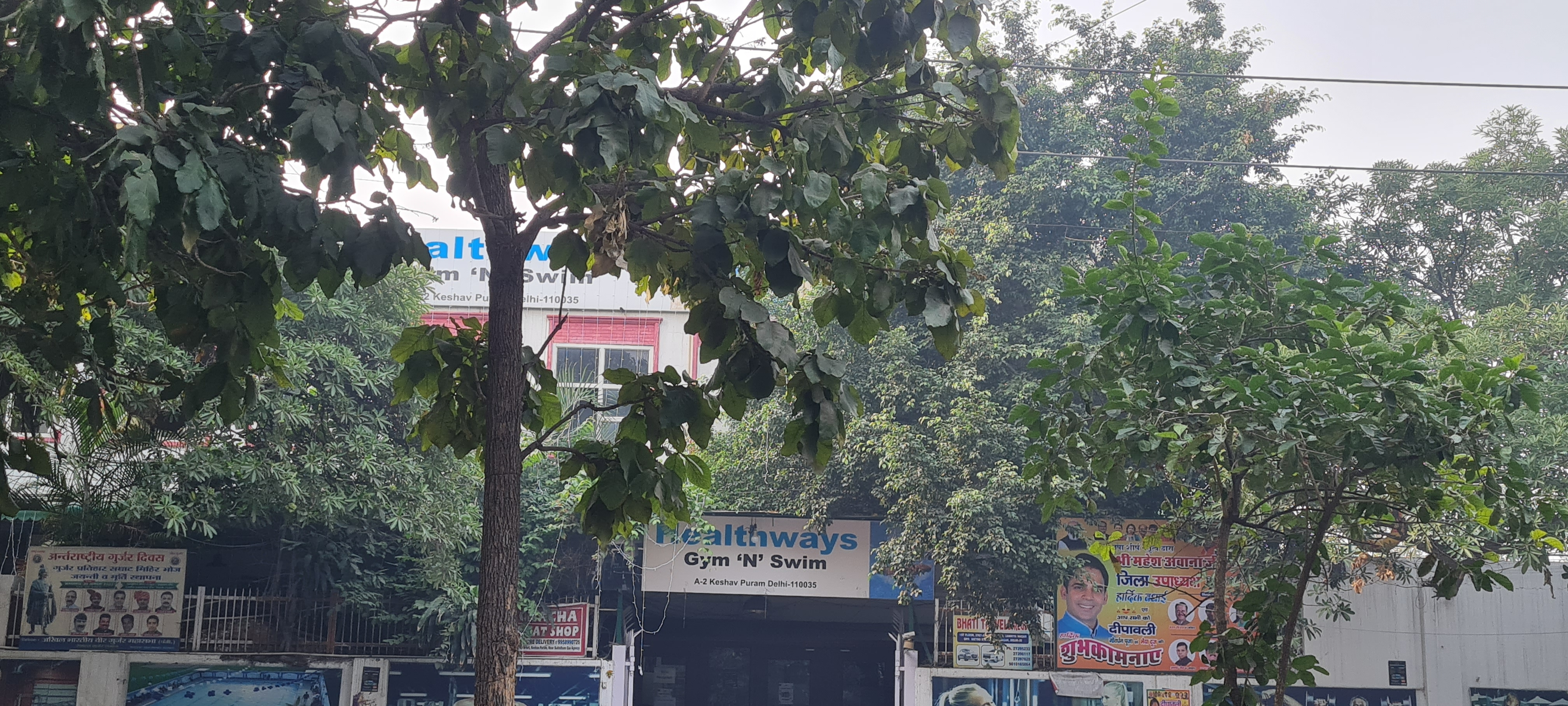

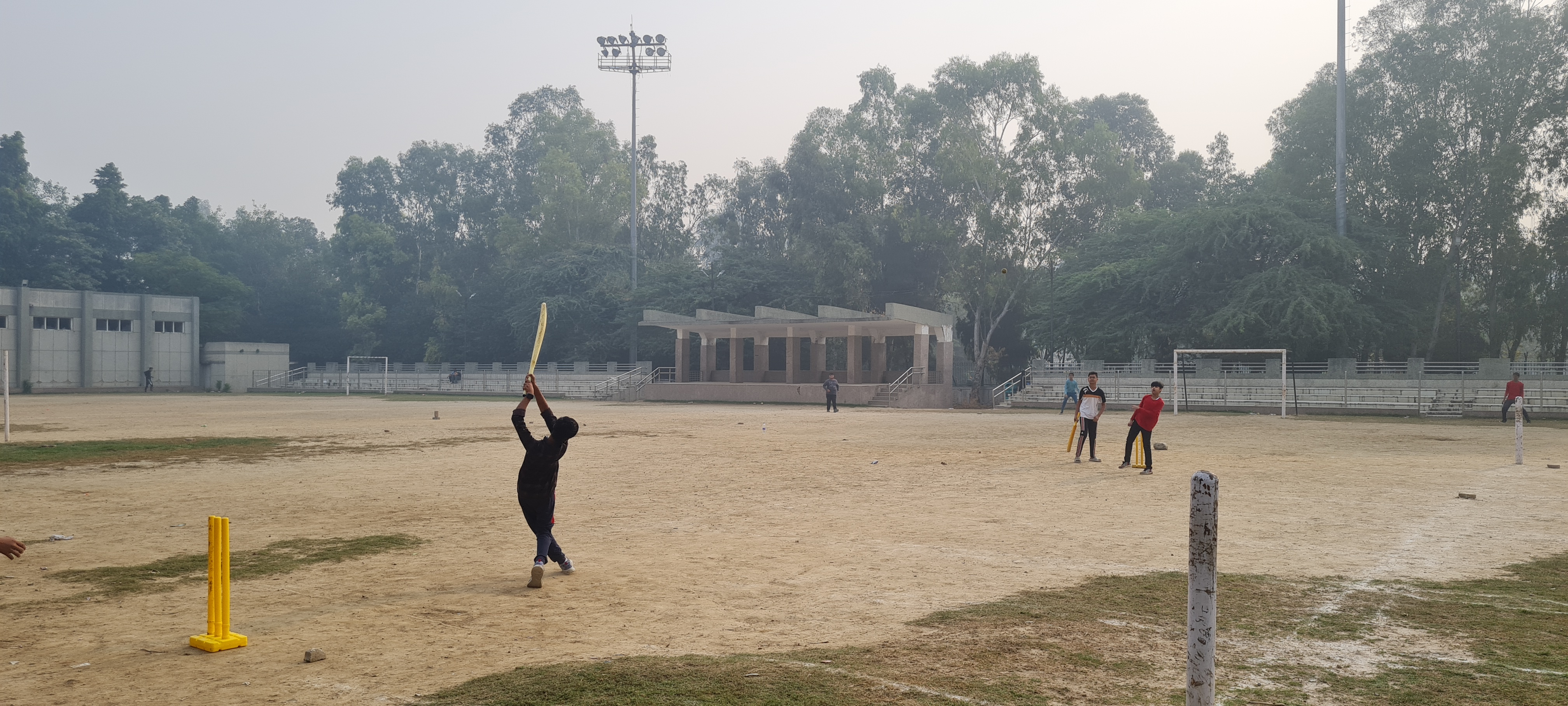

== Public services ==
Keshav Puram has an elderly recreation centre, namely Varishth Nagrik Manoranjan Kendra at C4 block. Keshav Puram has a local police station, which also serves the neighboring areas in northwest Delhi. There is a hospital under construction. Keshav Puram has two commercial zones, namely the Aggarwal Modern Bazaar and R G. The area also has two petrol stations. Keshavpuram has a library with the name Vijay Pal Memorial Library. Currently it has good sitting capacity with air conditioning where lot of students come and prepare for their competitive examinations.

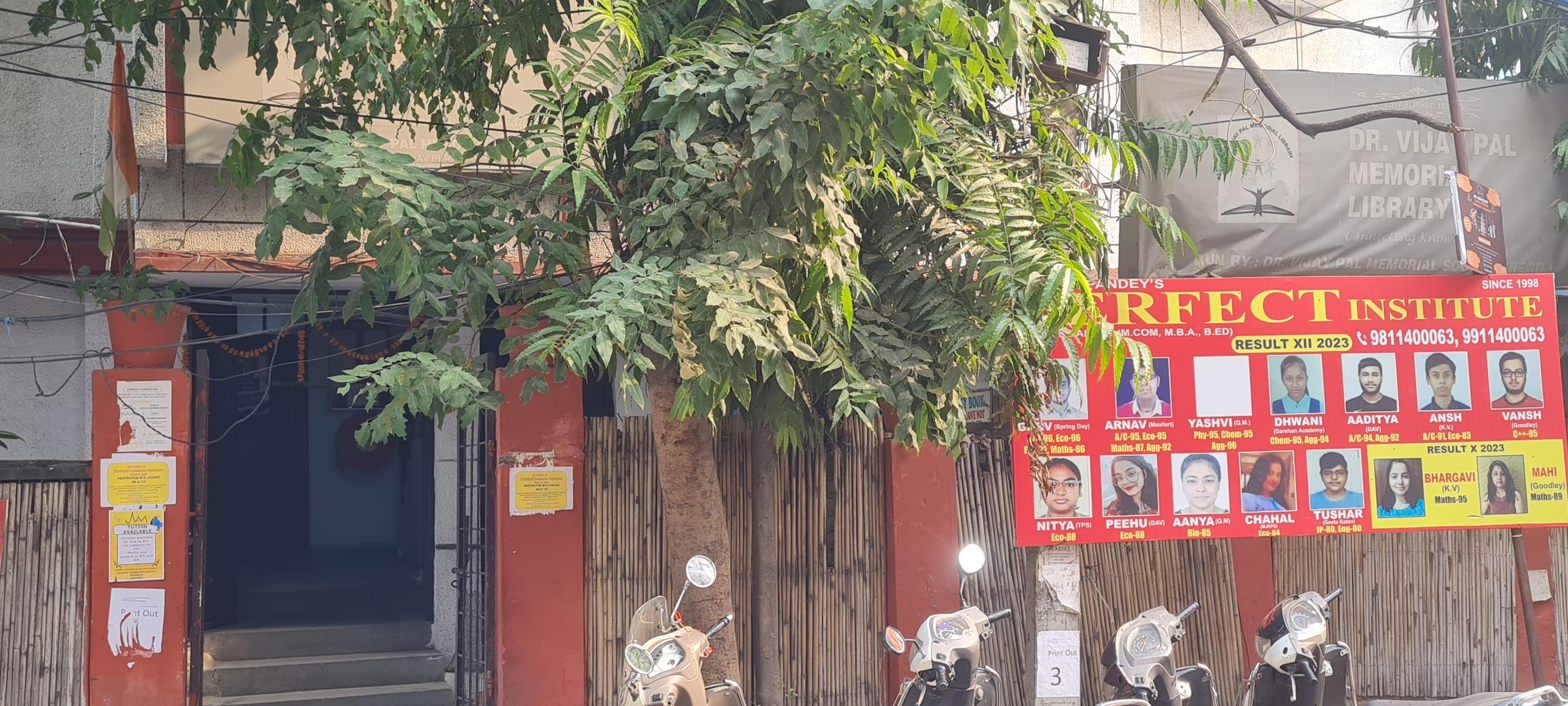

== Culture ==
There are multiple movie theaters in and around Keshav Puram. These are at Fun Cinemas (Netaji Subash Place), DT Cinemas (Shalimar Bagh), Shakurpur (Samrat Cinema), Anand Parbat (Liberty), Azadpur (Alpna), Shadipur (Satyam), Karampura (Milan), and Moti Nagar (Natraj) all within a radius of 5 km. Many cultural events are held regularly at Keshav Puram, including the Ram Leela. The life of Lord Rama is enacted on a podium, and organised on a large scale, with 4,000 to 5,000 daily viewers. Many other programs are held in the locality, such as the Khatu Shyam Sandhya and several Haryanvi cultural presentations. The Hasya Kavi Sammelan, which takes places on the occasion of Agrasen Jayanti, is also a regular feature. In addition to this, cultural programs are organised annually during the festivals of Janamashtmi and Holi.

There also many temples in this area. Some of them are Vishnu Mandir, Shiv Mandir, Sanatan Dharam Mandir, Gurudwara Singh Sabha, Sri Aiswarya Mahaganapathy Temple, Pardeshwar Dham, Sai Mandir, Luxmi Narain Mandir, Badri Kedanath Dhyansthali Mandir, and many more. All these temples organise special programs during the festivals and the whole community participates in it.

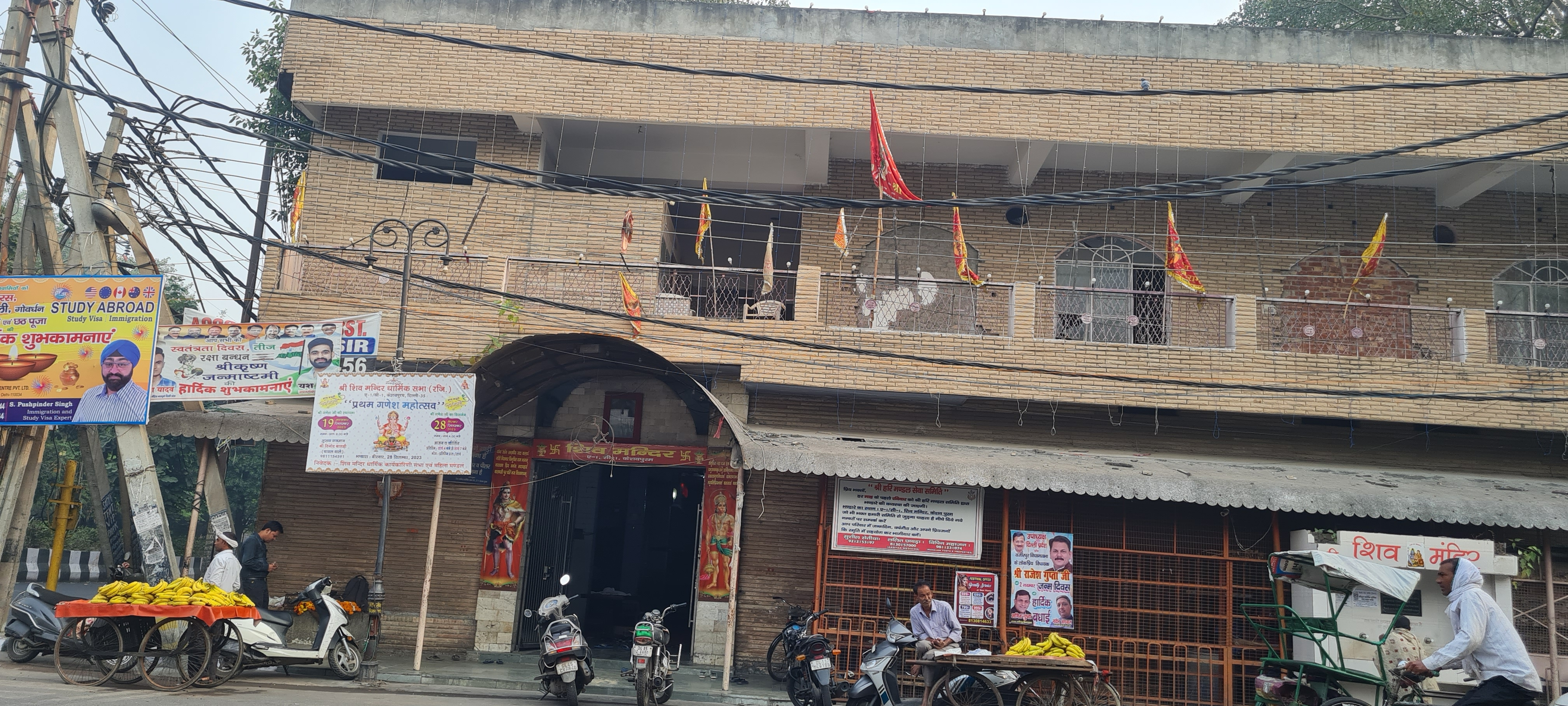

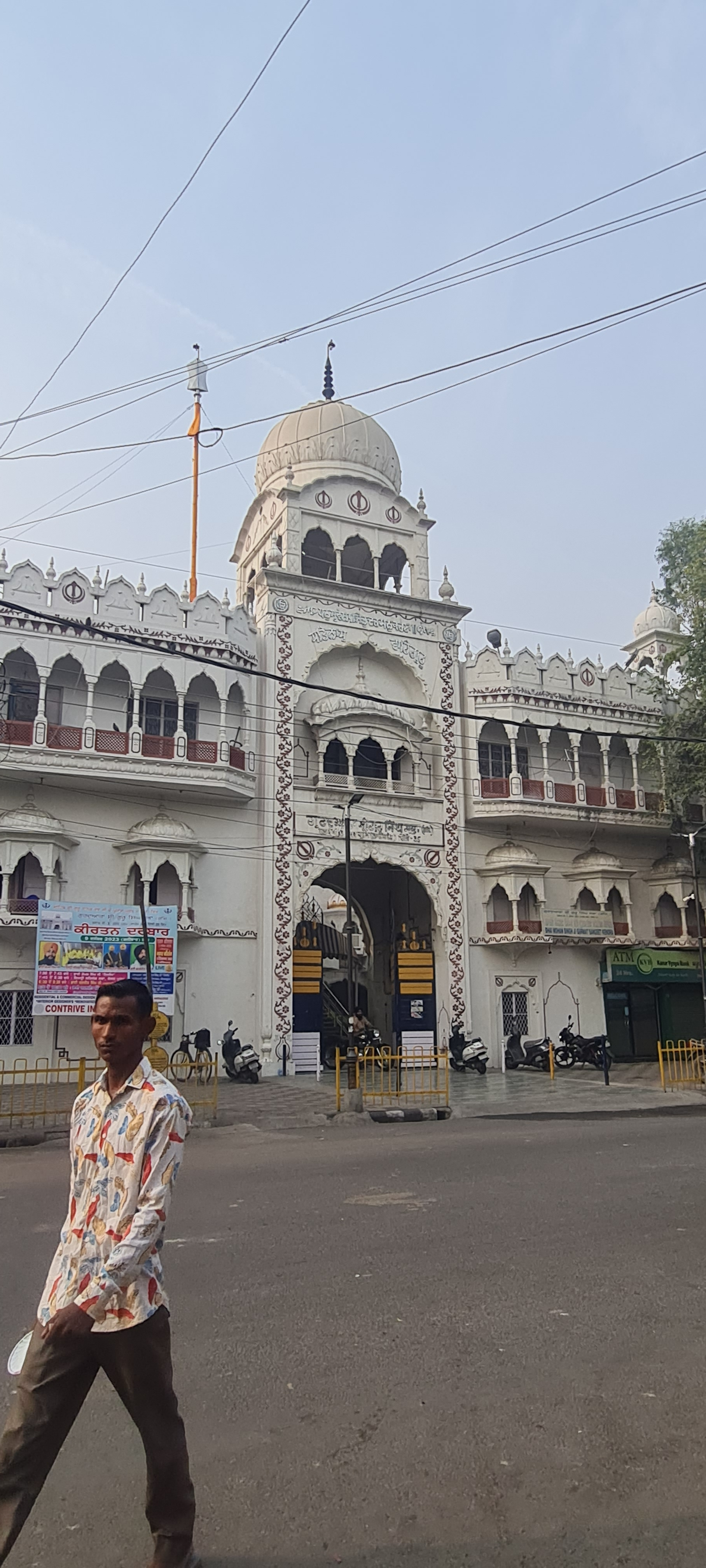

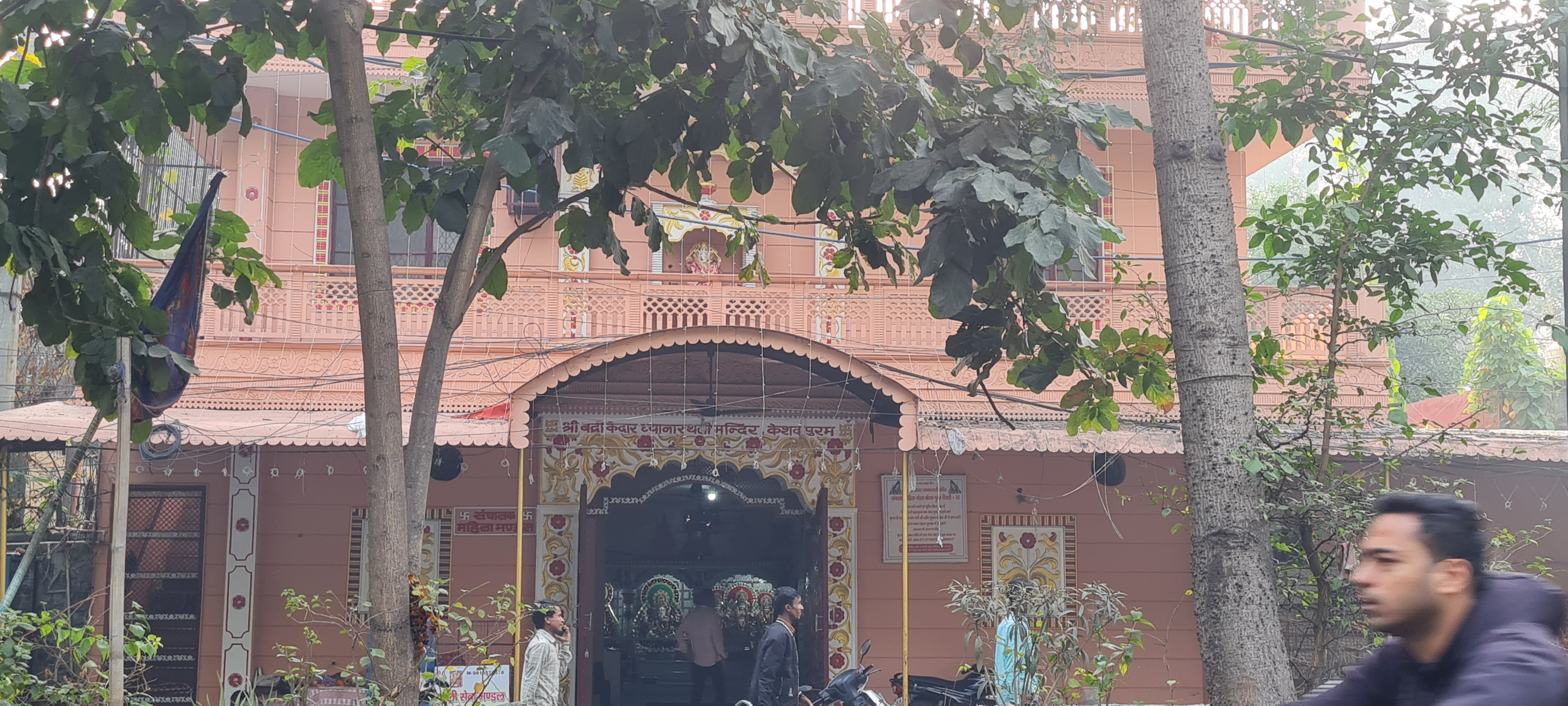

== Police Stations ==
There is one police station namely Keshav Puram Police Station which is close to Keshav Puram metro station.

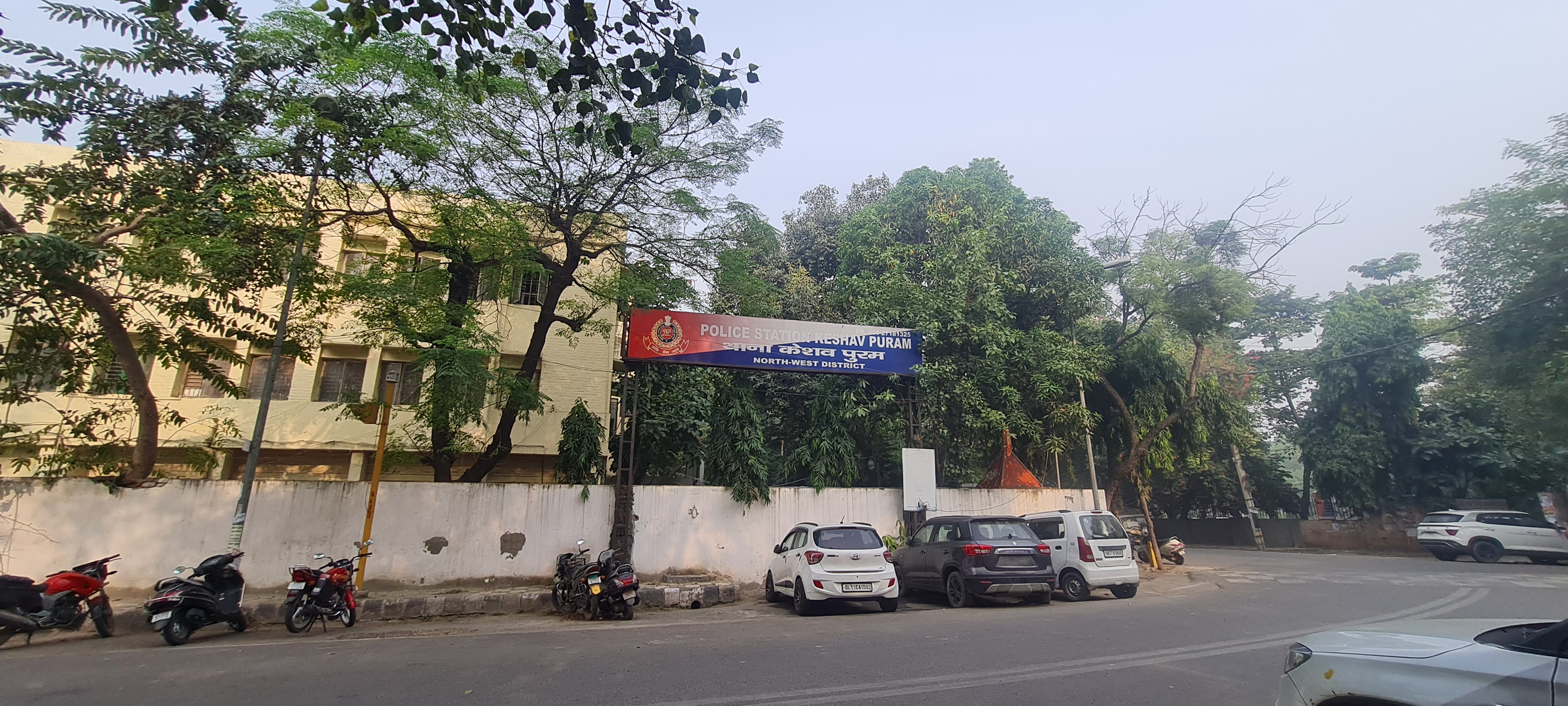
