= Eloor Lending Library Ernakulam =

Indian chain of privately owned public libraries

- Location: Ernakulam, Kerala, India
- Type: Privately owned public library
- Established: 1979
- Branches: 5

Collection
- Items collected: books, journals, newspapers, magazines, maps, prints

Access and use
- Access requirements: Membership required

Other information
- Website: http://www.eloorlibraries.in/

Eloor Lending Library is a chain of privately owned public libraries. The first branch was established in 1979 by P Luiz John on Press Club Road, Kochi. Apart from the original location, there are two other active branches in Thiruvananthapuram and Bengaluru.

This library is different from other conventional lending libraries, as they charge 10% of the cost of book as reading fee from members.

== Branches ==
- Trivandrum (1986)
- Bangalore (1988)
