= Kollam Public Library =

Library in Kollam, India

- കൊല്ലം പബ്ലിക് ലൈബ്രറി
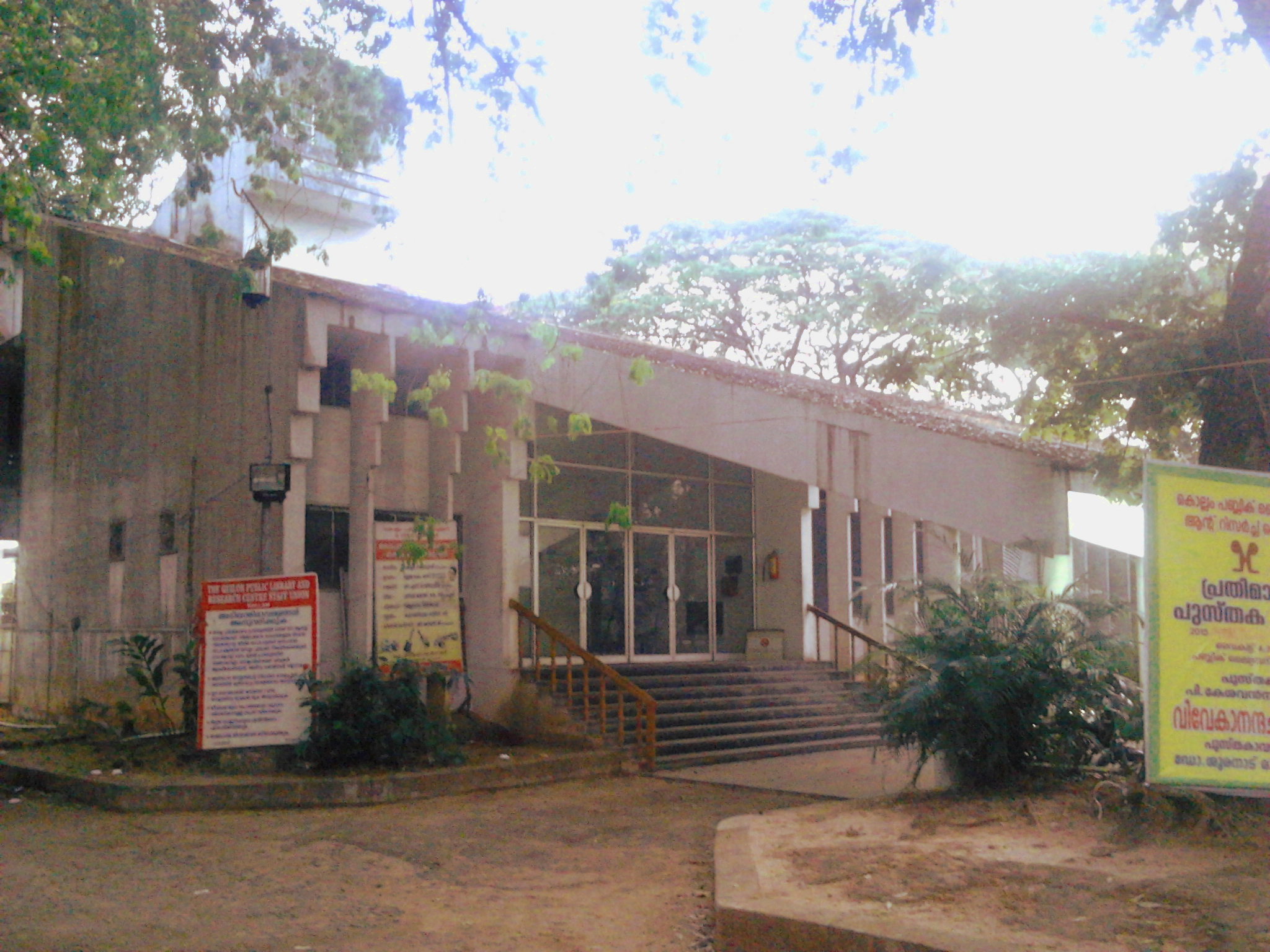
- Established: 1973
- Location: Kollam, Kerala, India

The Kollam Public Library is a public library located in Kollam, Kerala, India. It was founded in 1973 by K. Ravindranathan Nair, a prominent cashew businessman, who donated the profits of his film "Achanani" to build the library. The library is located in the Cantonment area of Kollam. The library has a collection of over 100,000 books, including books in Malayalam, English, Hindi, Tamil, and Sanskrit. It also has a collection of magazines, newspapers, CDs, and DVDs.

== History ==
K. Raveendranathan Nair, a Kollam-based cashew industrialist, produced the Malayalam movie Achani in July 1973. The movie was a box-office success, and Nair donated the entire profits from the venture to the construction of a public library in Kollam. This library is perhaps the only one in the country with a genesis linked to a movie.

The idea for the library had germinated in the minds of Nair, physician T. Kurien, and two journalists, M.S. Sreedharan and Devanand, in early 1973. They met with the then District Collector M. Joseph, who was supportive of their proposal. Nair's donation of nearly Rs.15 lakh (a large amount at the time) enabled the library to be built. It was inaugurated in January 1979 by then Prime Minister Morarji Desai.

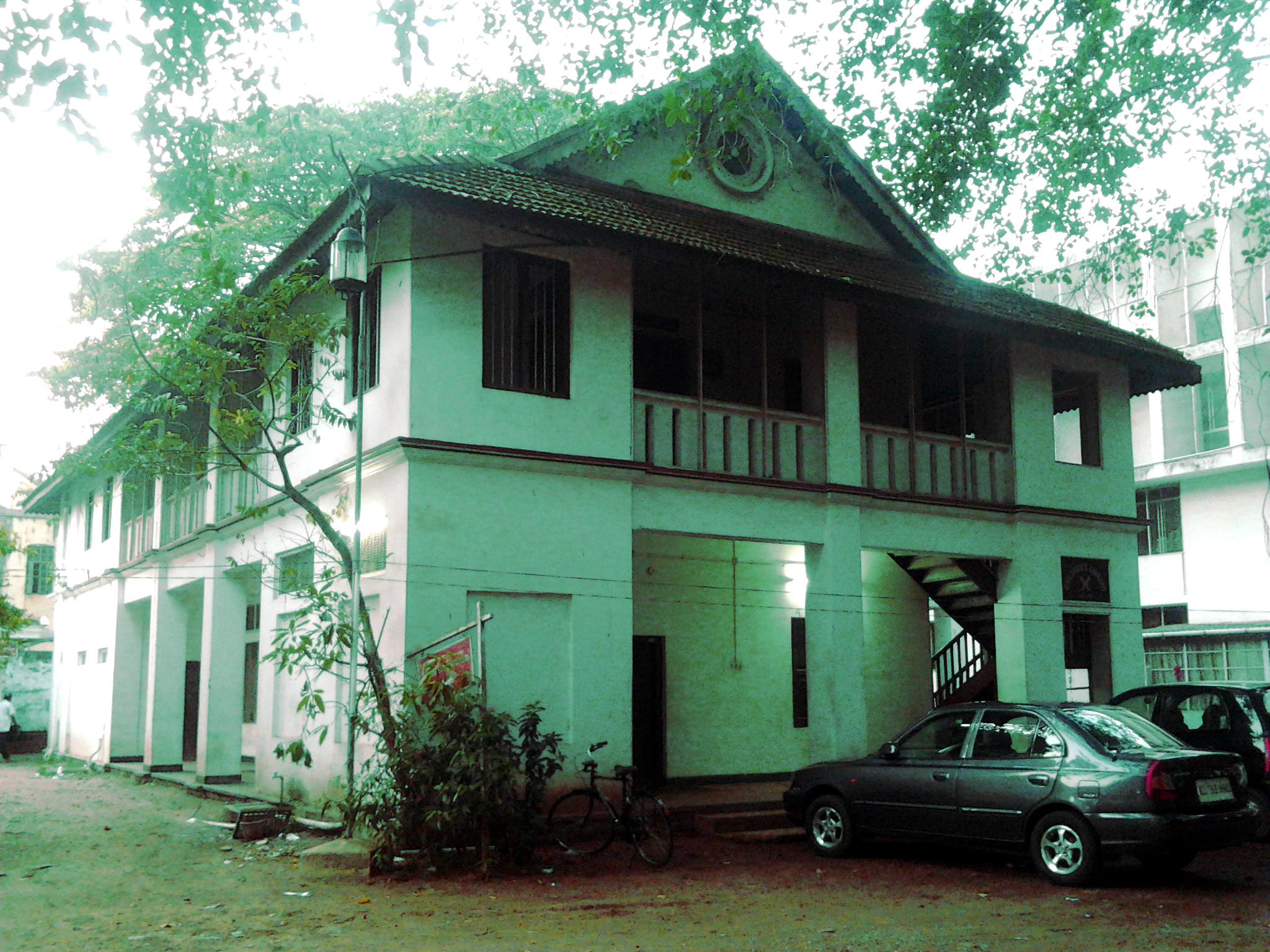
Children's Library

The ad hoc conference was called by the Collector to discuss the need for a public library in Kollam and to get the government to allocate suitable land in the city to house the library. The meeting was successful in registering a society, under the Travancore-Cochin Charitable Societies Act, named the Quilon Public Library and Research Centre (QPLRC).The immediate task of the society was to identify land. The society office-bearers met TK Divakaran and put forth a suggestion for allocating some land from the Rest House complex at Chinnakada.

The Rest House complex was a large property that was owned by the government. It was located in a prime location in Kollam, and it was well-suited for a public library. The society's request was granted, and the government allocated some land from the Rest House complex to the QPLRC.
