= University of Rajasthan Library =

Academic library in Jaipur, Rajasthan, India

The University of Rajasthan Library is an academic library at the heart of the University of Rajasthan.

== History ==
The University of Rajasthan was established by an act of legislature on 8 January 1947. The library was created later on, after the availability of a small annex in the same compound in 1949. A budget provision of 20,000 Rs. was made for the library and about 1,500 books were immediately acquired. The first book, Preface to Library Science by Dr. S. R. Ranganathan, was added on 11 May 1950.

The library which was initiated in the corner of the office of the First Vice-Chancellor Dr. G. S. Mahajani in Kesargarh (a fort-like structure on Jawaharlal Nehru Marg, which now houses the offices of the popular Hindi newspaper Rajasthan Patrika). The library moved to the completed portion of the new building in October 1958. Jawaharlal Nehru formally inaugurated the new building in October 1959.

== Infrastructure ==
=== Location ===
Rajasthan University is close to the now-famous Bidla Mandir on the Jawaharlal Nehru Marg. The central Library is near the entrance gate of the university on its left side.

=== Building ===
The building of the library has a spread of the traditional red stone of Jaipur. The surrounding of the building has greenery all around. The massive building is an area of 10,000 sq. mt. Area of the reading rooms is 3000 sq. mt. and carpet area for stack room is 4000 sq. mt.

A new building has been added to the existing library. This is named as Dr Babasaheb Bhimrao Ambedkar Library Building. This will house modern library facilities, including digital library services. The building has been inaugurated on 16 November 2022 by Sh Ashok Gehlot, the Chief Minister of Rajasthan government.

=== Staff ===
The library is administered by a University Librarian and supporting staff. As per the university prospectus, Professor S. L. Jain has served as honorary director of the library.

=== Collection ===
The library holds a collection of more than 4 lakh documents, which includes books, bound journals, theses, reports, microfilms, etc. The library acquires current journals. In addition the library provides access to e-journals available through UGC Infonet e-journals consortia.

==== Abu Collections ====
The library has a rich collection of documents of historical importance to the State of Rajasthan. A part of the collection of the British resident then stationed at Mount Abu has been inherited by the Rajasthan University Library, which is popularly known as Abu Collection. This includes government reports, gazetteers and other publications dating back to early 19th century.

==== Microform Collection ====
The library has the collection of microfilms and microfiches. This collection of the library includes a variety of reports, for example, census of India publications of the earlier period beginning from 1872, a large number of gazetteers of India down to district level published during the British period. The memoirs and annual reports of Archaeological Survey of India, legislative proceedings/debates for the period 1854 to 1957 for the Central Legislative Body, proceedings of many other legislative bodies in the country, a large number of periodicals, many newspapers (e.g., Tribune from 1881 to 1995), newspapers from a number of South Asian countries etc. The library has microfilm readers to facilitate the use of these documents.

==== Special Collections ====
The University Library has developed a number of special collections namely Hindi Collection, Jain Collection, Rajasthan Collection, and Fine Arts Collection.

The library has a small collection of CD-ROM databases.

==== Other departmental libraries and collection ====
The collection of some science books and journals is located in the concerned departments.

Besides, some reading material is available in departmental libraries. The departmental libraries in the university are in the departments: Academic Staff College, Faculty of Fine Arts, Indira Gandhi Centre for Human Ecology Environment and Population Studies, History, Law, Library and Information Science, Philosophy and Podar Institute of Management.

==== Library services ====
A variety of library services, in addition to user consultation and lending facilities, are offered, via general guidance and orientation, reference service, reprography service, Interlibrary loan service, database search service, online search options, information display and notification, Internet and e-mail facility, CD-ROM database search service, e-journal accessibility, etc.
