= Visakhapatnam Public Library =

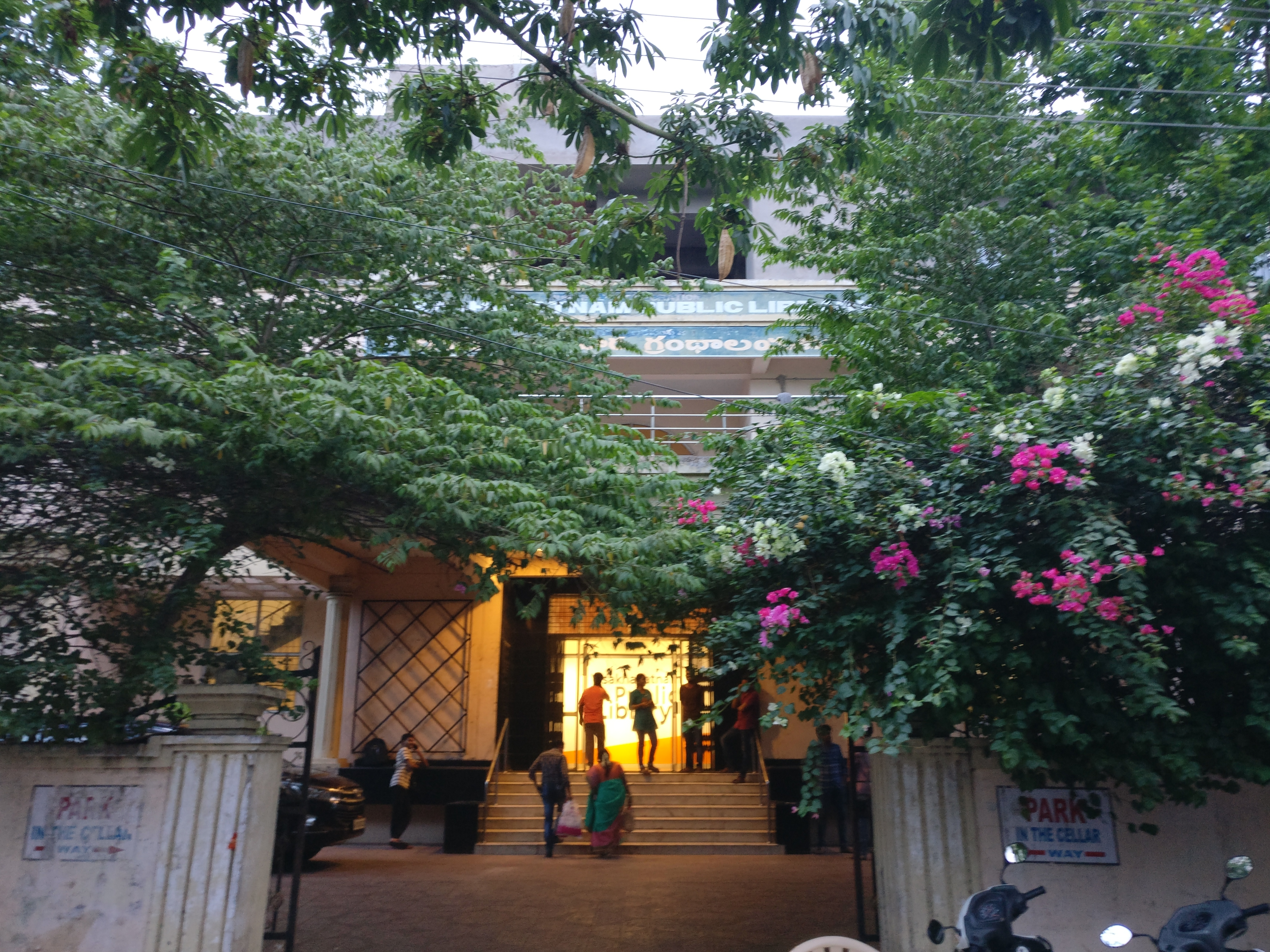
- Library entrance
- 17.729453°N 83.307085°E
- Location: Dwarkanagar, Visakhapatnam, India
- Type: Public library
- Service area: Area under Greater Visakhapatnam Municipal Council

Collection
- Size: 54000+ books

Access and use
- Population served: 12 lakhs

Other information
- Director: Dr S.Vijaya Kumar (Chairman), Mr DS Varma (Secretary)
- Parent organization: Visakhapatnam Public Library Society
- Website: http://www.visakhapatnampubliclibrary.org/

Visakhapatnam Public Library is a public library in Visakhapatnam city, in Andhra Pradesh, India. It provides free library services, a reading environment, a social space, free wi-fi and study room services to the general public. The Centre for Policy Studies, a sister organisation is co-located in the building.

== History ==
The library was conceived in 1996 by a group of public-minded citizens. A plot of 2,000 square yards (1,700 m^{2}) land was provided by then-Mayor of Visakhapatnam, Sabbam Hari. The foundation stone was laid on 23 October 1999. The Library was inaugurated on 3 December 2003 by Shri Surjit Singh Barnala, then Governor of Andhra Pradesh. It began operating from 15 July 2004.

The library is owned by the Greater Visakhapatnam Municipal Corporation. A trust, Visakhapatnam Public Library Society, was formed comprising eminent citizens to direct the affairs of the library. As of 2019, the chairman is Dr S. Vijaya Kumar and the Secretary is Mr DS Varma.
