= Sivagurunathan Tamil Library =

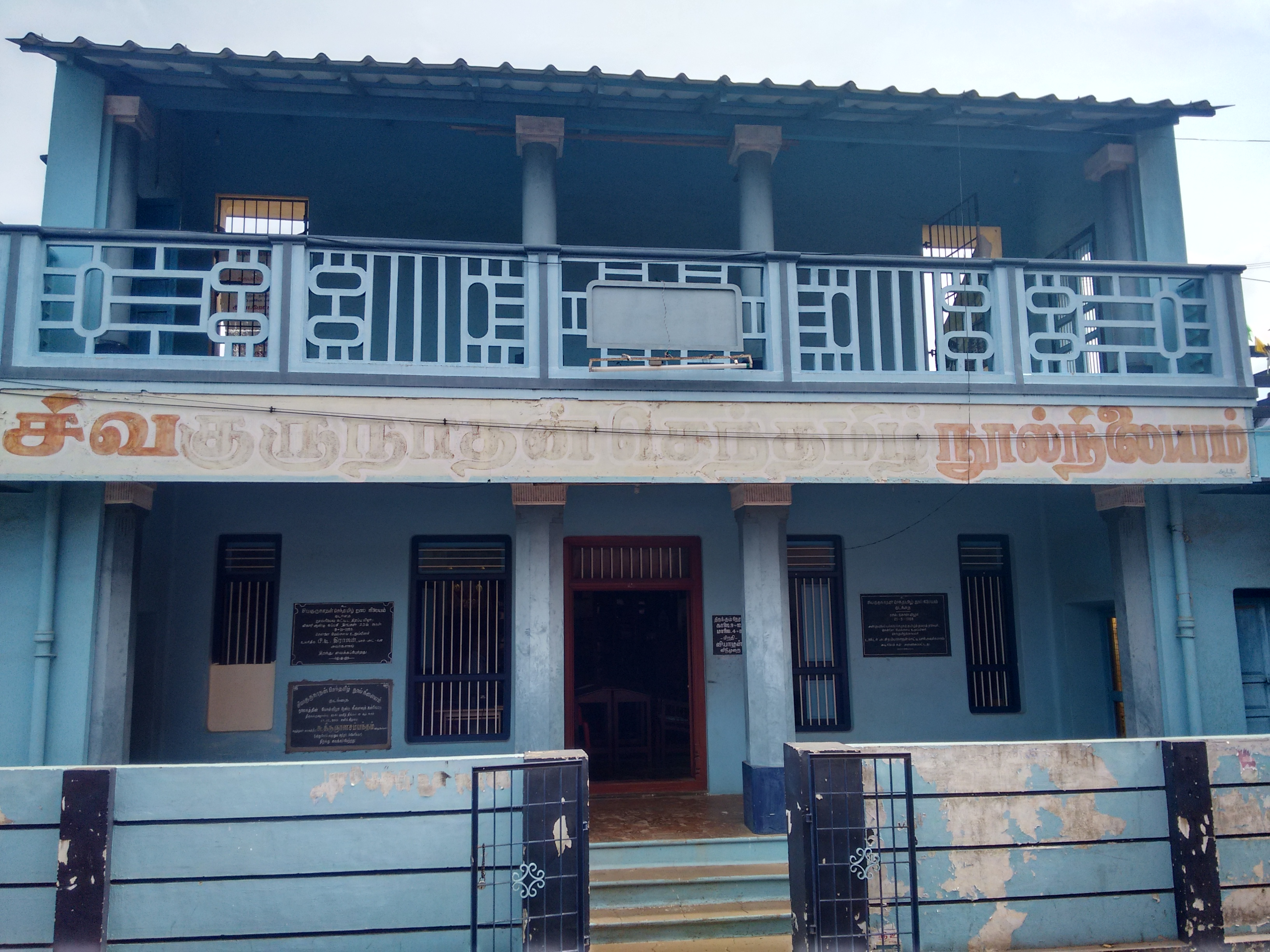
- Sivagurunathan Tamil Library
- 10.957183790653248°N 79.36355456101029°E
- Location: Kumbakonam, India
- Established: 1959

Sivagurunathan Tamil Library is a private library located at Kumbakonam in Thanjavur district of Tamil Nadu. It has more than 25,000 books.

== History ==
The foundation stone for this library was laid on 21 May 1958 by Prof. Dr.A.Chidambaranathan Chettiar and was declared open by P. T. Rajan on 9 January 1959. Celebration on its collection of 10,000 and 12th anniversary was held on 23 May 1971. Its golden jubilee was held in February 2010.

== Collections ==
The first catalogue of the library has 5,000 books on 44 subjects including Puranas, Shastra, Religion, Music, History, Sangam literature, Tirumurai, Translation, Mathematics, Iconography, Epigraphy, Autobiography, Tamil language, literature, grammar, linguistics, Shaivism, Vaishnavism and Mahabharata. It has also annexures.

The second catalogue of the library has the list containing 5,000 books on Politics, Science, Agriculture, Islam, Christianity, Drama and Novel.

== Available facilities ==
Two catalogues on Miscellaneous books, two catalogues on newspapers and magazines and one catalogue about English books are found. Information pertaining to the year of the work is found in the catalogue. The readers who opt to come and visit the library can get two books at a time. Necessary facilities are available for reading and taking notes. The library functions, except Thursdays, from 9.00 a.m. to 12.00 noon and from 4.00 p.m. to 8.00 p.m.

== Gallery ==
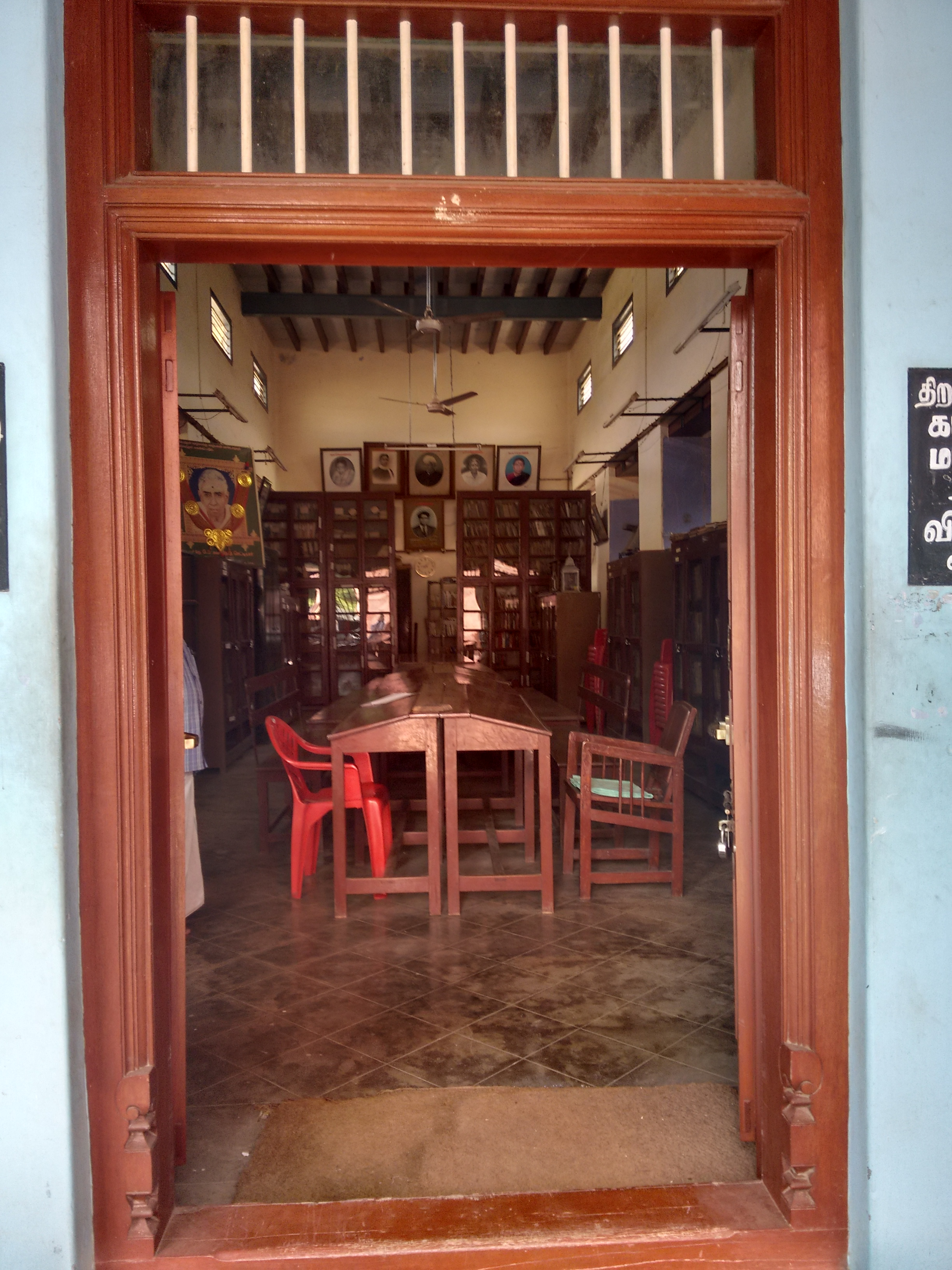

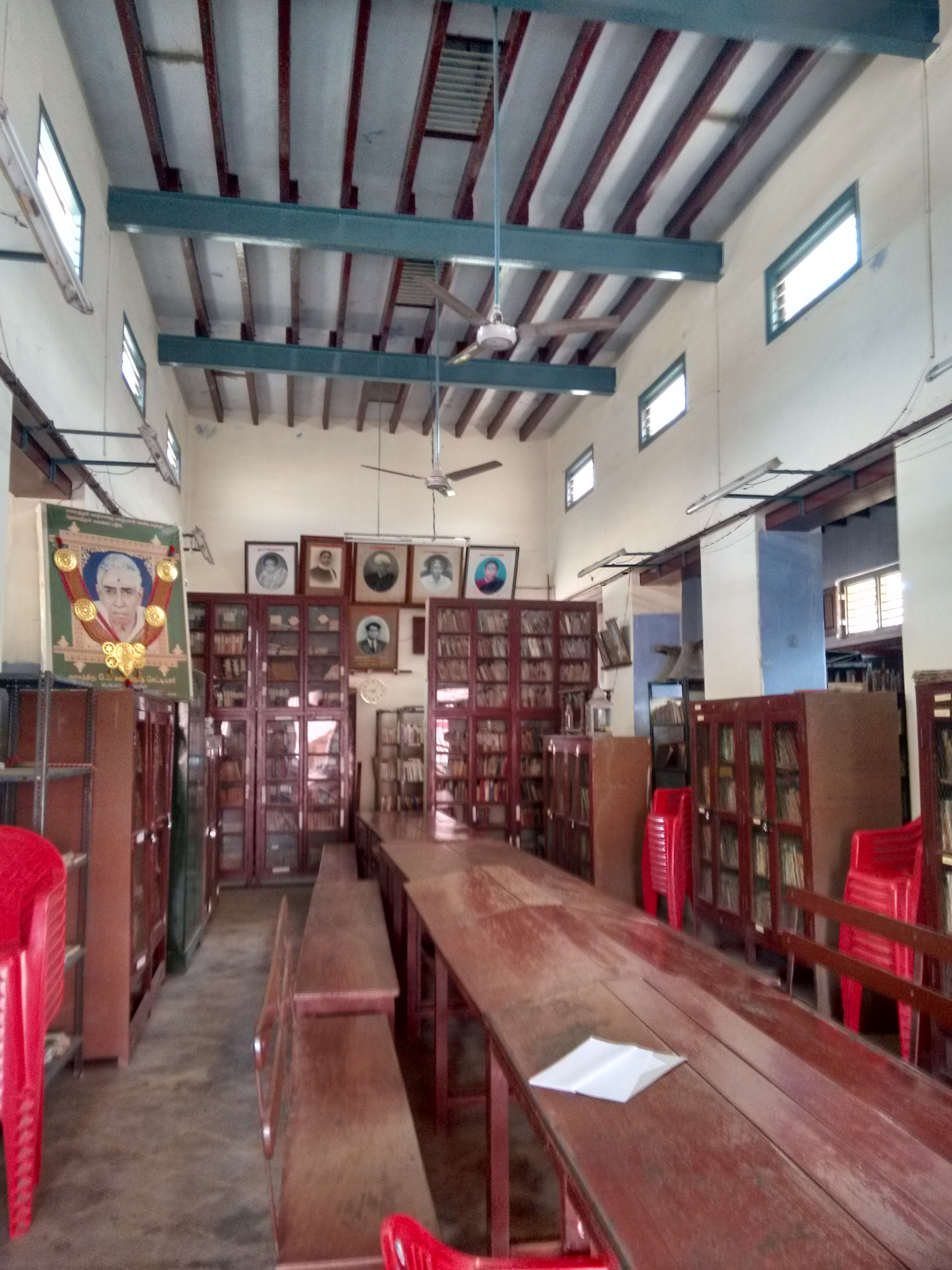

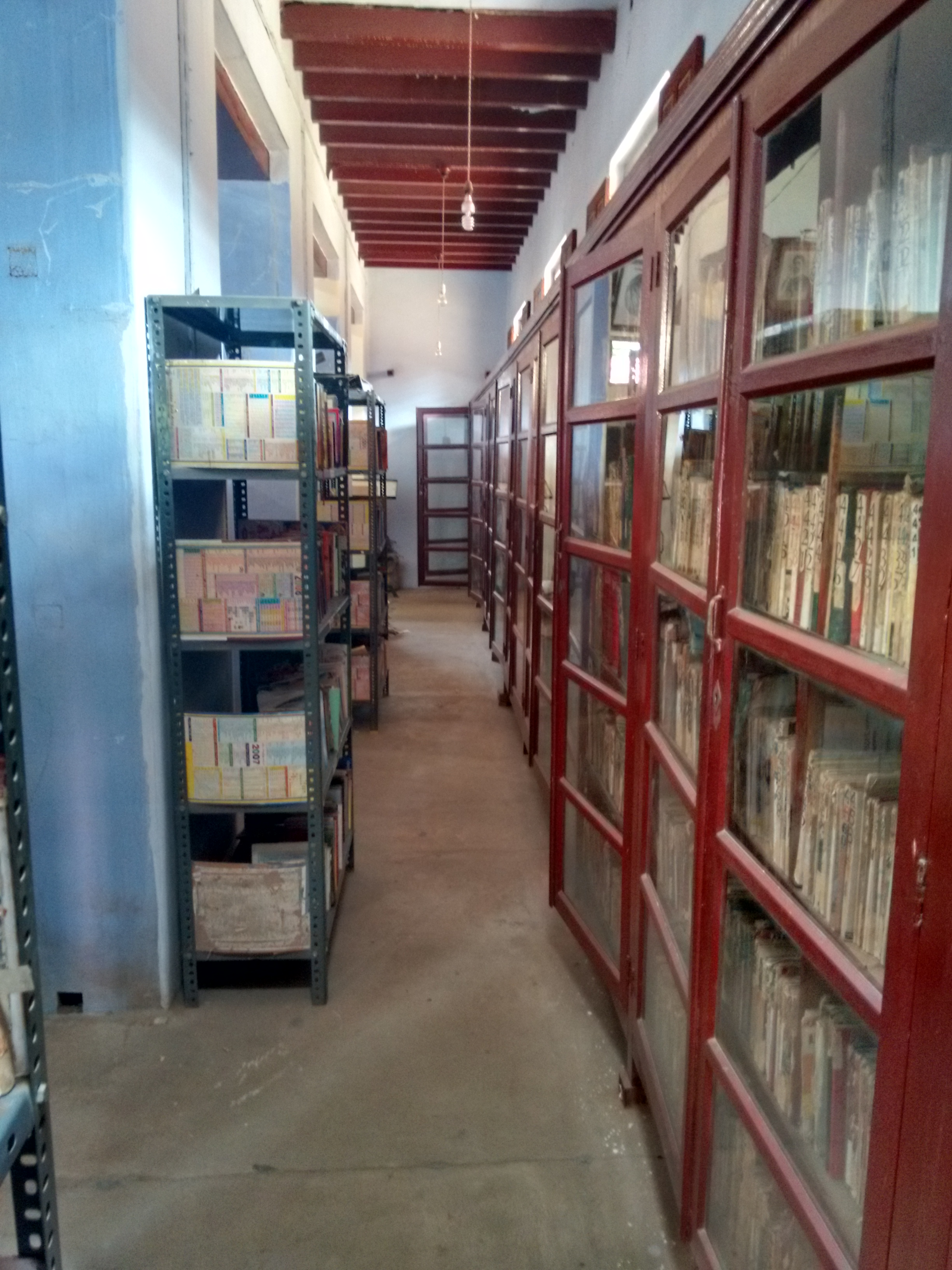

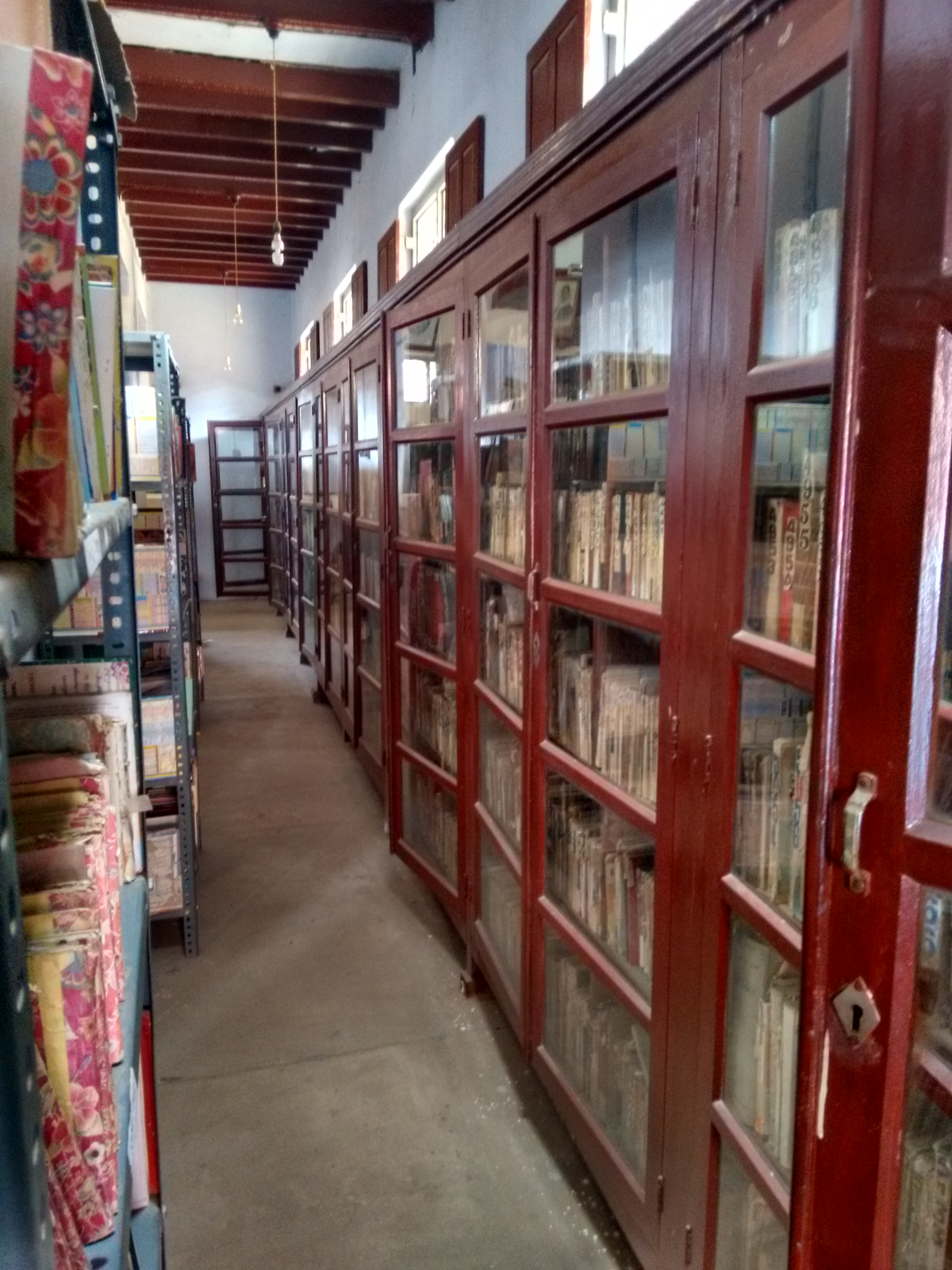

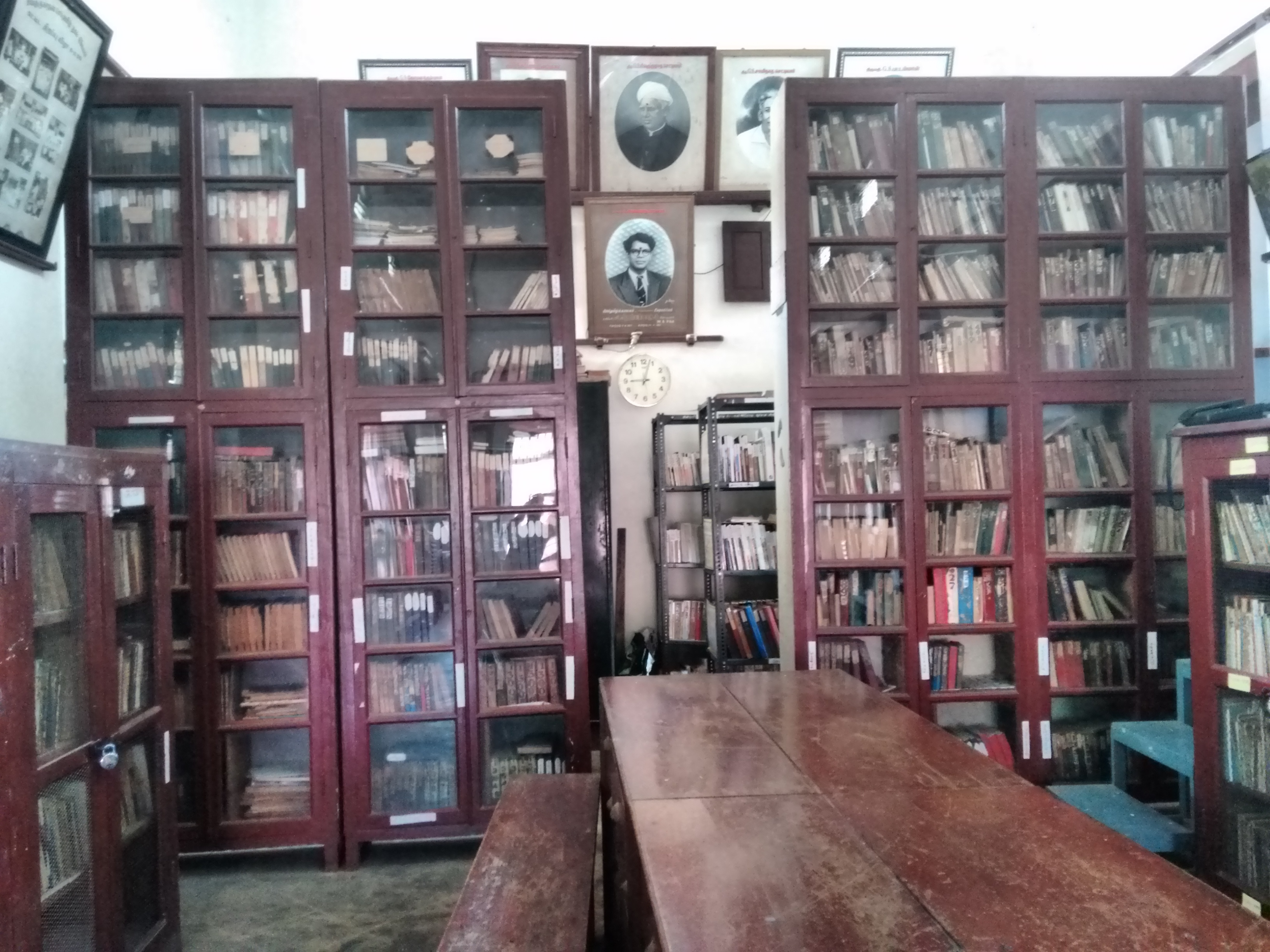

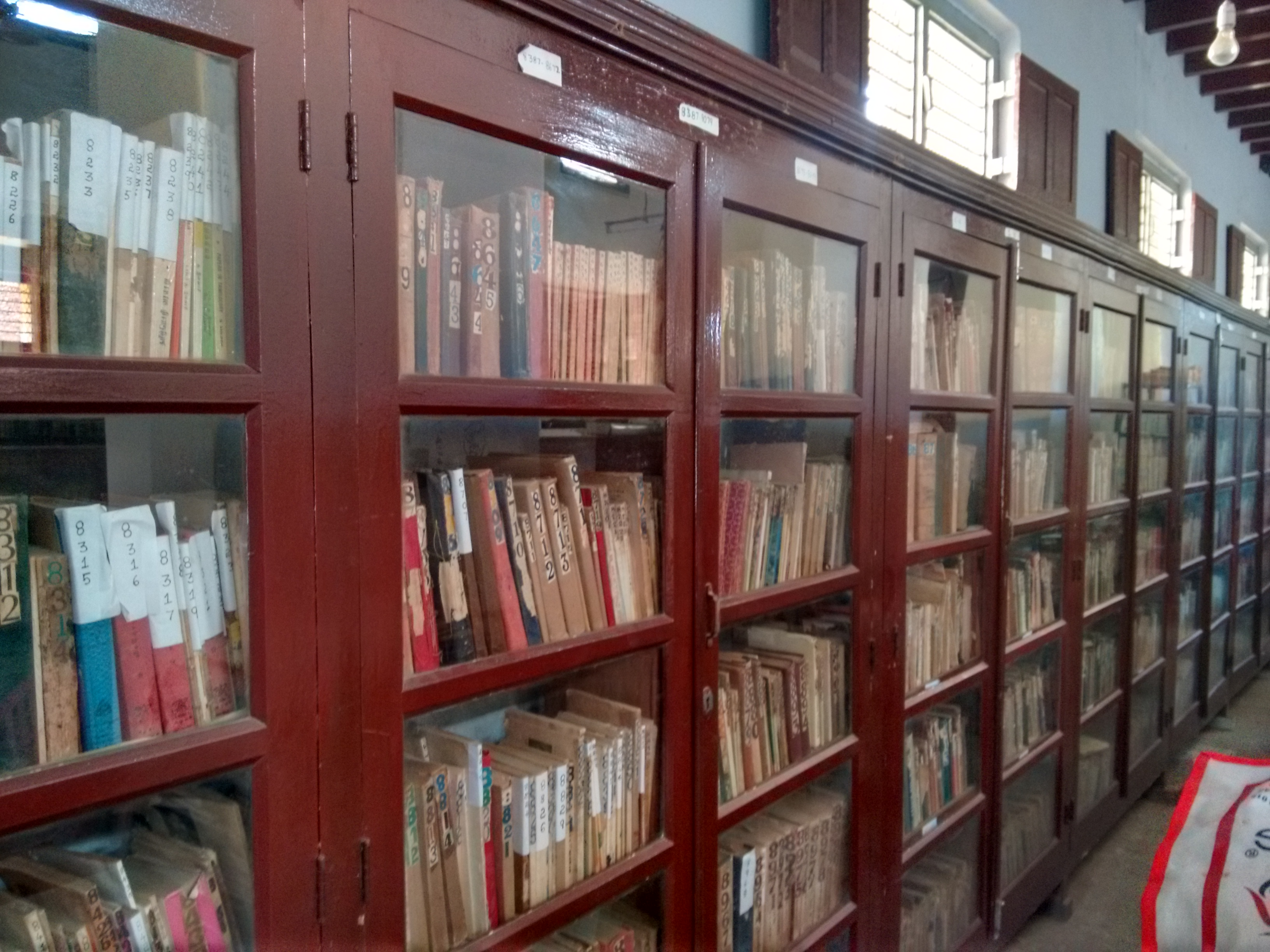

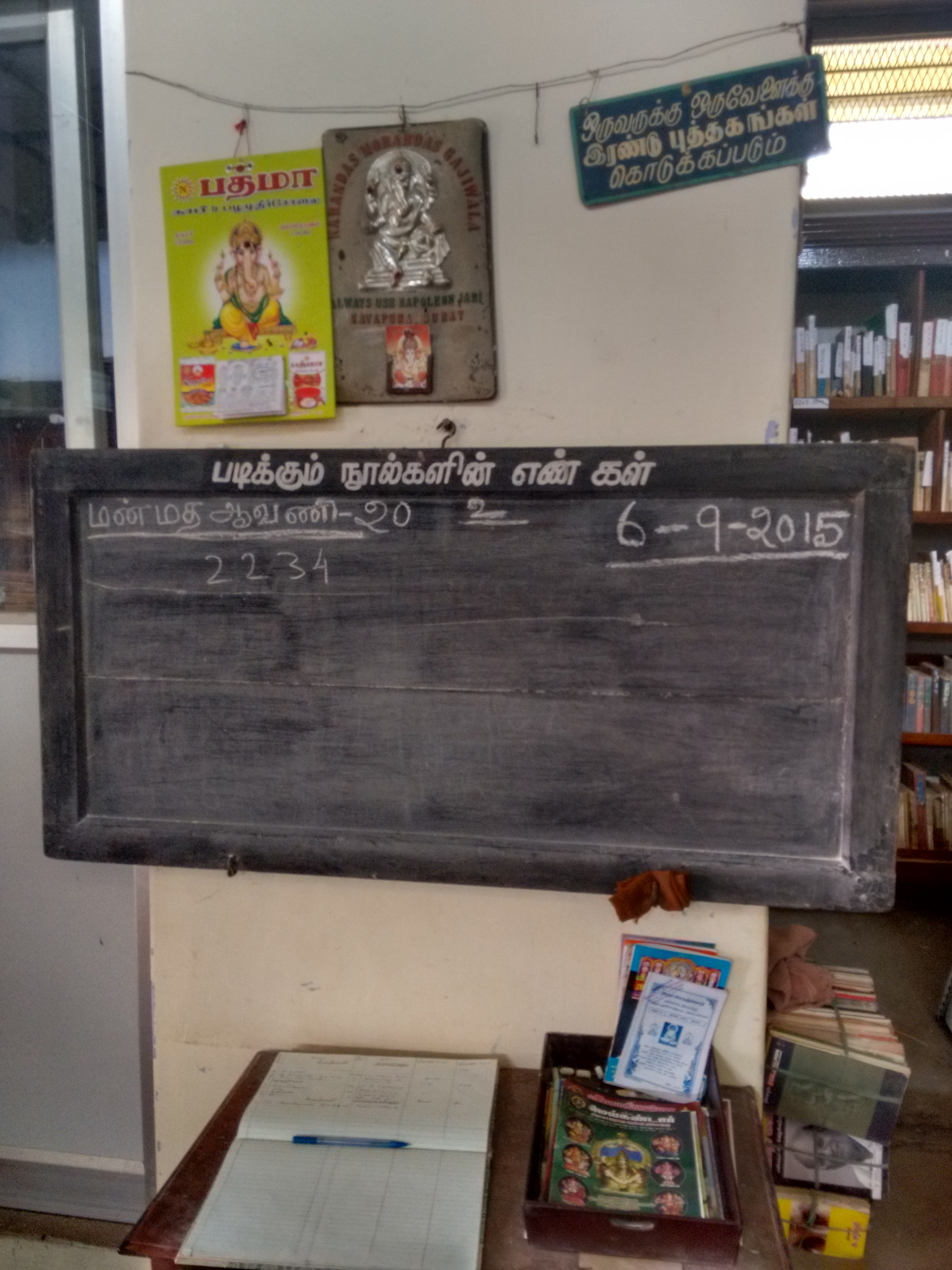
