= Bihar Hitaishi District Central Library, Patna City =

Bihar Hitaishi District Central Library
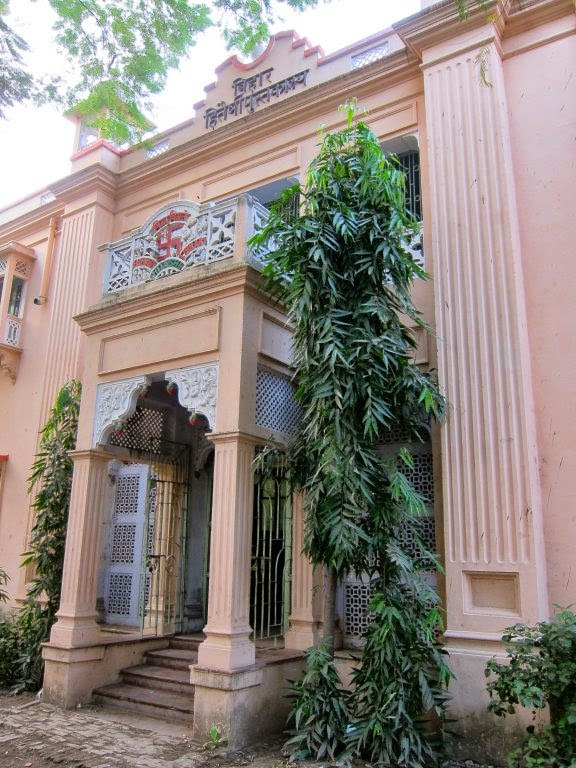
- Library entrance
- Location: Guru Gobind Path, Mangal Talab, Patna City, Bihar, India
- Type: Public
- Established: 1883; 143 years ago

Collection
- Items collected: Books, newspaper, periodicals, digital media

Access and use
- Access requirements: open to anyone with a genuine need to use the collection
- Population served: 45000

Other information
- Director: Mahendra Arora
- Website: biharhitaishilibrary

Bihar Hitaishi District Central Library, Patna City, Bihar, India formerly Bihar Hitaishi Pustakalaya is a central government recognized district level library located in Mangal Talab area of Patna City.

== History ==
The library is situated near the Mangal Talab in Patna City. The Bihar Hitaishi Library was established as far back as 1880 now this library is functioning as the District Library of Patna. The library has its own building. Its stock consists of 10,344 books in general section and 5,100 books in Mobile library section.

The library subscribes to 14 daily newspapers and 1 magazines. It has 499 members on the roll. The membership fee is Rs. 500 which is admission fee and Rs. 20 is charged as monthly subscription.

== Computer Literacy Program ==
Library had started a computer literacy Program for its members with the help of Bill & Melinda Gates Foundation in 2014. In this program members are educated to gain DCA level knowledge in computers, It is free for library members.

A memento of recognition was awarded by Bill & Melinda Gates Foundation at India Public Libraries Conference 2015 to Librarian Mr. Vivek Kumar Sinha on the behalf of Bihar Hitaishi District Central Library.

== Gallery ==
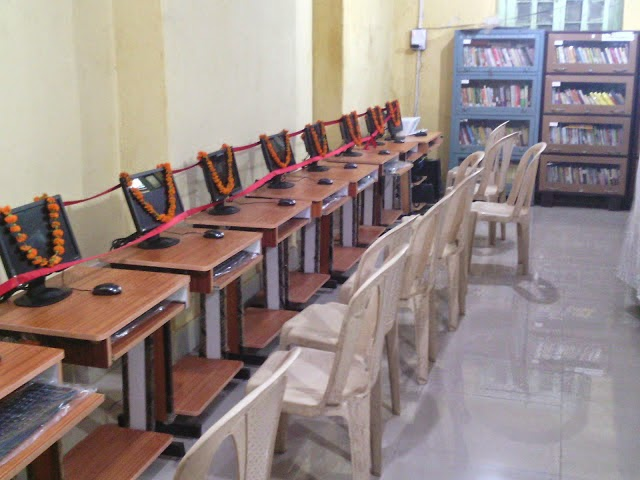
Computer lab

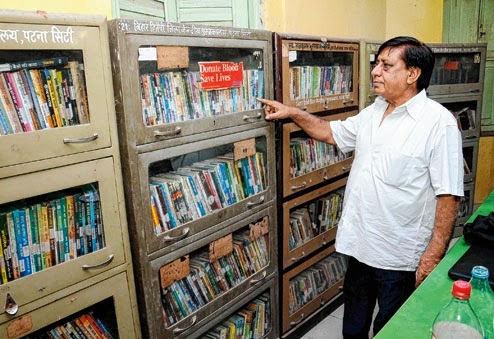
Shri Mahendra Arora, director

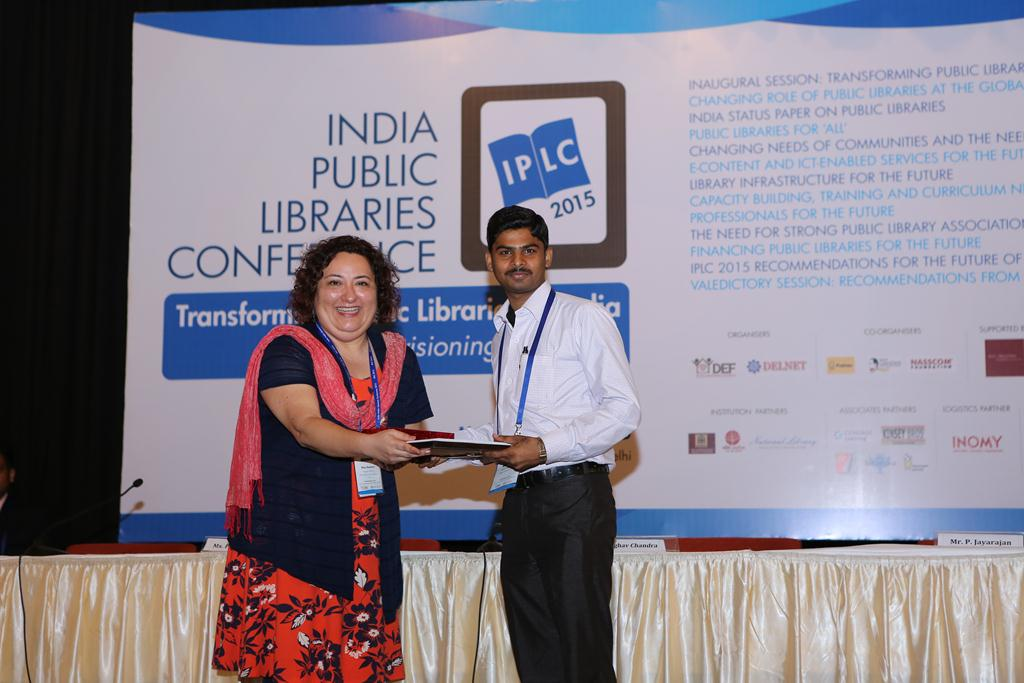
Ms. Pilar Pacheco & Mr. Vivek Kumar Sinha at IPLC 2015
