= Romain Rolland Library =

Public library in Pundacherry, India

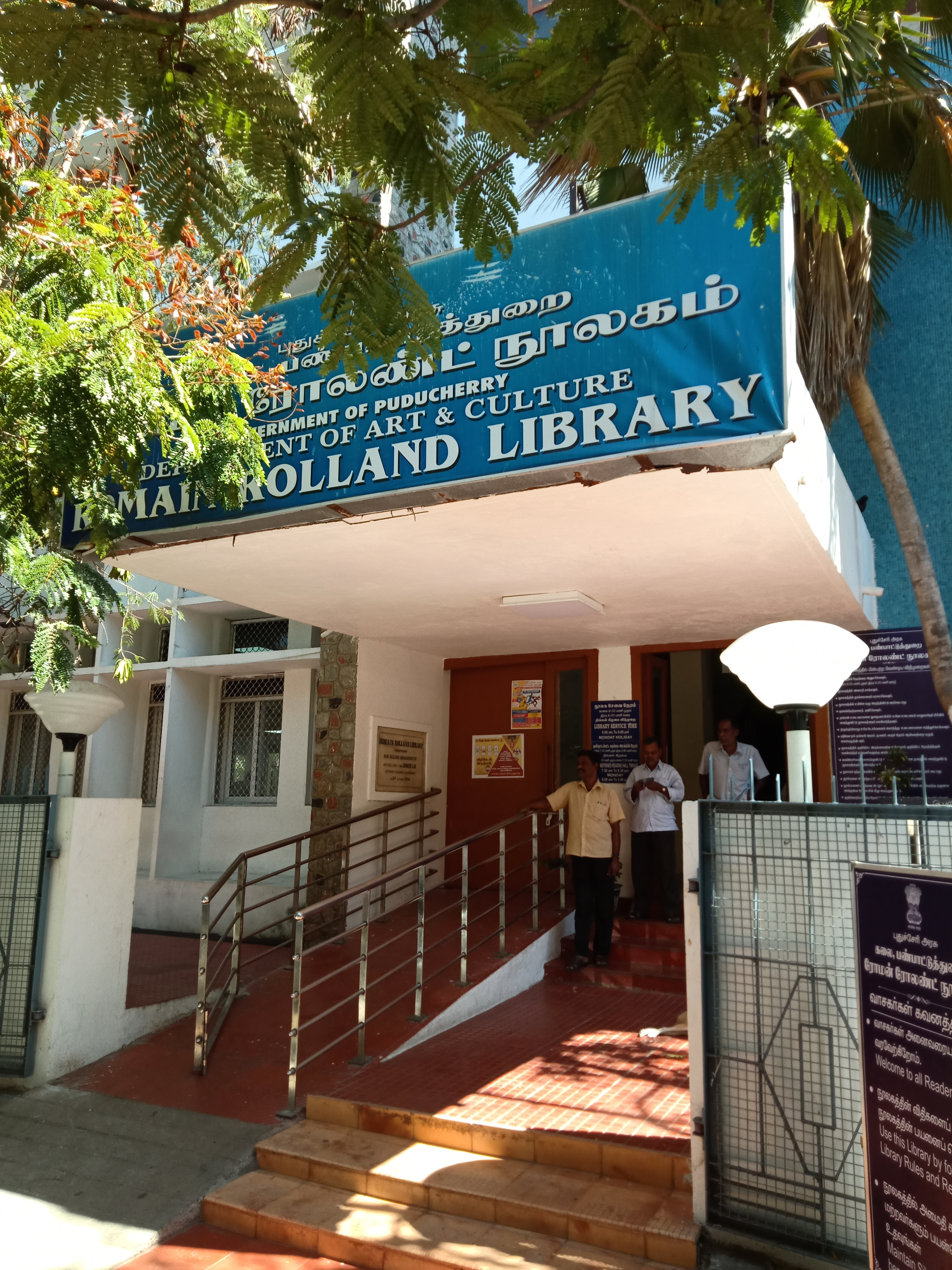
- 11.934366942487252°N 79.83576590089076°E
- Location: Puducherry, India, India
- Type: Public Library
- Established: 16 May 1827

Collection
- Items collected: Books, Journals, Magazines, Braille Books, Manuscripts in French and English.
- Size: 400,000

Access and use
- Circulation: 200,000

The Romain Rolland Library, founded in 1827 as the Bibliothèque Publique, is one of the oldest Libraries of India located in the union territory of Puducherry.

== History ==
In the year 1966 when the birth centenary of the French scholar Romain Rolland who was also a contemporary and a close friend of Mahatma Gandhi was celebrated, the Library was renamed after him and ever, since it is known as ‘Romain Rolland Library’.

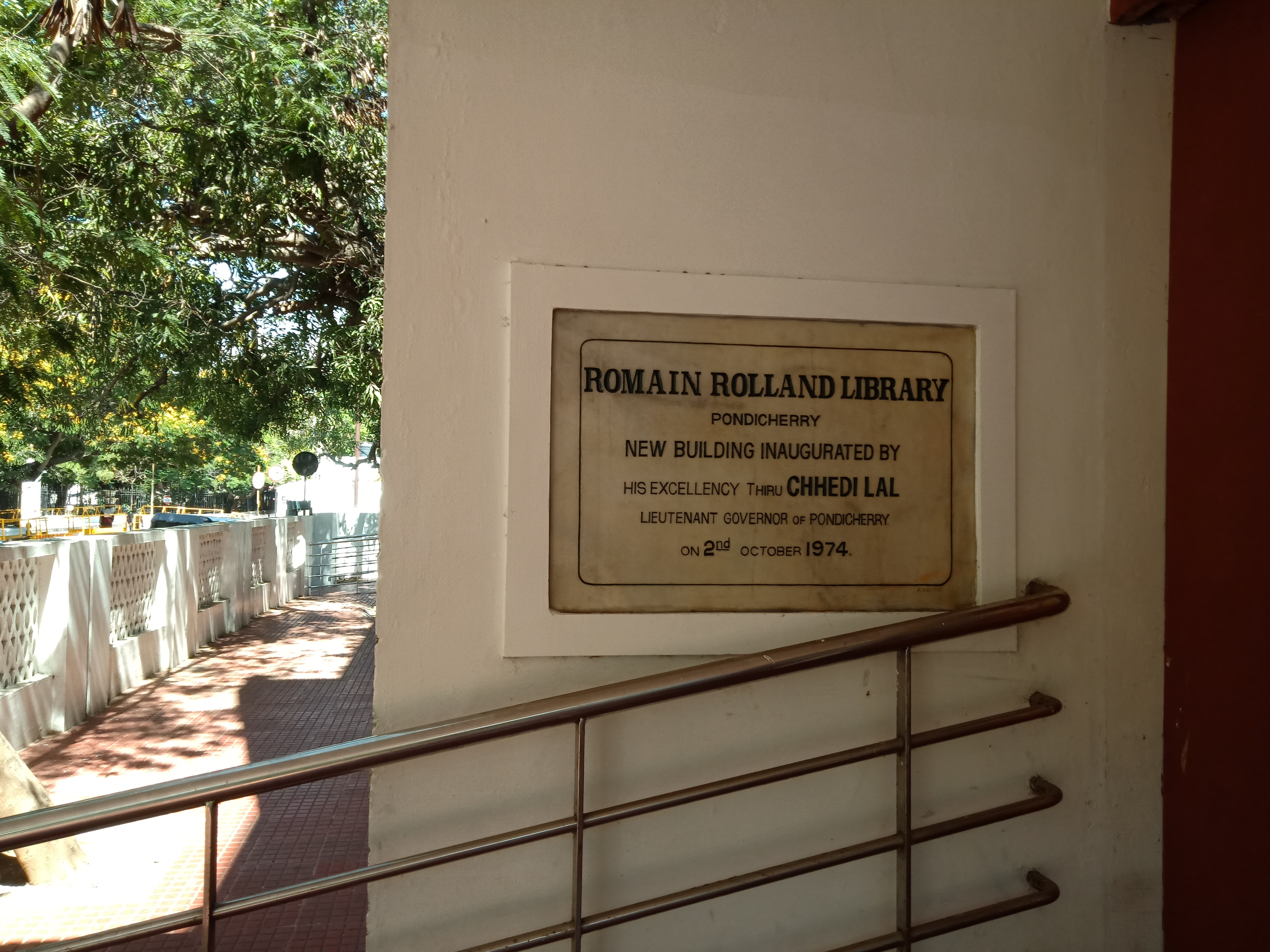
Plaque
