= Mumbai Marathi Grantha Sangrahalaya =

Public library in Mumbai, India

- Location: Mumbai, Maharashtra, India, India
- Type: Public library
- Established: 1898
- Service area: Mumbai and Pune
- Branches: 29

Collection
- Items collected: Books, journals, bibliographies, dolamudrites
- Size: 645,569 books (2021)

Access and use
- Members: 11,787 (2014)

Other information
- Director: Sharad Pawar (President)
- Employees: 100+ (2019)
- Website: Official website

The Mumbai Marathi Grantha Sangrahalaya (MMGS) is a public library in Mumbai, India. It is one of India's oldest libraries, founded in 1898. It has a collection of more than 645,569 Marathi books, some of which are rare and over 200 years old. The library was used by various notable personalities and Marathi scholars, including Bal Gangadhar Tilak and B. R. Ambedkar. It was declared as a special museum by the Ministry of Higher and Technical Education (Maharashtra) in 2019.

== History ==
The Mumbai Marathi Grantha Sangrahalaya was established in 1898 by Mukund Balkrishna Gurjar, Narhar Mahadev Joshi, Shridhar Balaji Modak, Anant Neelkanth Pithkar, Vinayak Balwant Joshi, Narayan Krishna Gadre, Shankar Hari Shejwalkar, Narayan Mahadev Bakre, Vitthal Vasudev Tillu, Ganesh Laxman Page and Ambadas Gopal Puntambekar. On 10 March 1959, the central library and office building of the organization at Naigaon, Dadar was inaugurated by the Prime Minister of India, Pandit Jawaharlal Nehru.

In February 2019, it was declared as a special museum by the State Minister of Higher and Technical Education, Uday Samant. The library also owns Sharada Cinema, a 75-seater single-screen theatre in Dadar's Naigaon, which has been shut since November 2017. As of 2020, books at the main building were under threat to such hazards as water leaks and pigeons due to years of deterioration at the main (Dadar) branch.

== Collections ==
Mumbai Marathi Grantha Sangrahalaya has a collection of more than 645,569 books in the Marathi language. Some of the books are more than 200 years old. Some rare books kept by the library include Geeta Rahasya written by Bal Gangadhar Tilak, Vishnushastri Chiplunkar's essays, Mao Che Laskari Avahan on the 1962 Sino-Indian War and a book named Maharana Pratap Ani Tyache Purvaj. It has books authored by V.V. Shirwadkar, Shripad Krushna Kolhatkar, Vinda Karandikar and Krishnaji Keshav Damle.

== Membership ==
The membership has declined over the years to about 8,642 from 11,787 in 2014. The library had 44 branches, which has now come down to 29 branches. Of these 29, only 21 are operational. It had 11,787 members in 2014.

== Funding ==
The Mumbai Marathi Grantha Sangrahalaya is funded by the Brihanmumbai Municipal Corporation (BMC) and the State Government of Maharashtra. In 2019-20, it received funding of ₹19.68 lakh from BMC and ₹34.00 lakh from the state government. In October 2019, HT reported that one of the major problems for the library is the pittance funding it gets from BMS and the state government.

Of the 29 branches of the Mumbai Marathi Grantha Sangrahalaya, 4 are located in Pune and the rest is in Mumbai. As per a 2019 report, fourteen of these libraries receive a maximum of Rs 1 lakh each from the Brihanmumbai Municipal Corporation, while the state government contributes a lesser amount.

== Trustee ==
Its trustees include NCP parliamentarian Supriya Sule, Shiv Sena parliamentarians Sanjay Raut, Anil Desai and political analyst Pratap Asbe. Nationalist Congress Party chief and former Union minister Sharad Pawar have headed the library for 28 years after being elected as the president unopposed. Sharad Pawar is the current chairperson of the library trust.

Pawar won as president in the election held in October 2021, defeating his opponent, Dhananjay Shinde, the general secretary of Aam Aadmi Party's Maharashtra state unit.

Suresh Prabhu, Bhalchandra Mungekar, Arvind Sawant, Vidya Chavan and Shashi Prabhu are serving as the chairpersons of the library trust.
