= City Central Library, Hyderabad =

Library in Telangana, India

City Central Library Hyderabad
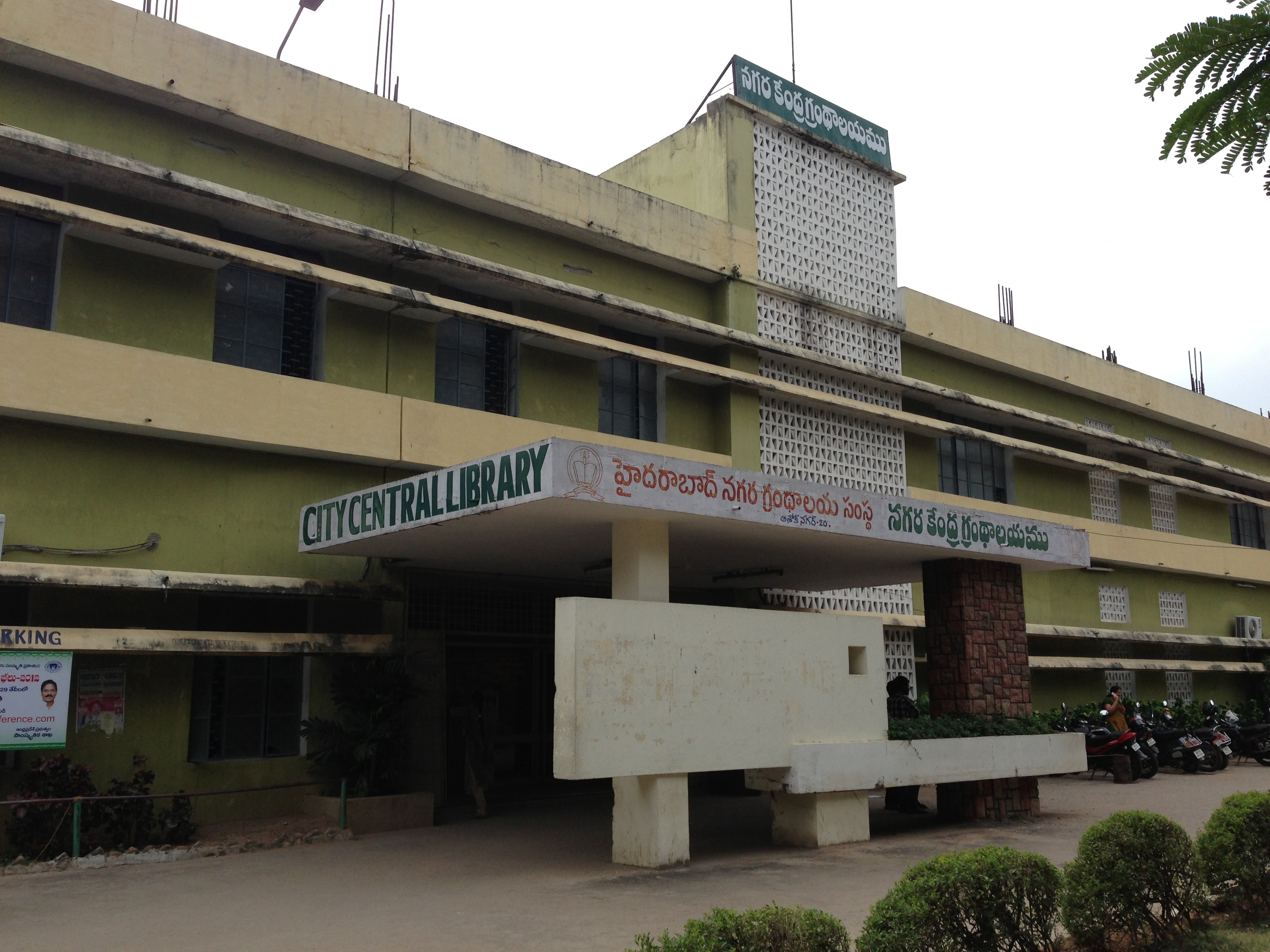
- Main building
- 17.404280665832573°N 78.4927091776999°E
- Location: Chikkadpally, Hyderabad, India
- Type: Public library
- Established: Early 1960s

Collection
- Items collected: Books; journals; newspapers; magazines; manuscripts
- Legal deposit: Yes

Access and use
- Access requirements: Open

City Central Library (Telugu: నగర కేంద్ర గ్రంథాలయం) is a public library located in Chikkadpally, Hyderabad, India. It was established in the early 1960s.
