= British Library, Hyderabad =

Coordinates: 17°24′26.18″N 78°28′20.11″E

British Library
- Location: Hyderabad, Telangana, India
- Established: 1979

Other information
- Website: https://www.britishcouncil.in/library

The British Library is located in Hyderabad, India. Established in 1979, it is among the most popular libraries in the city with a vast collection of encyclopaedias, geography, science, History and other books.
