= Sri Krishna Devaraya Telugu Bhasha Nilayam =

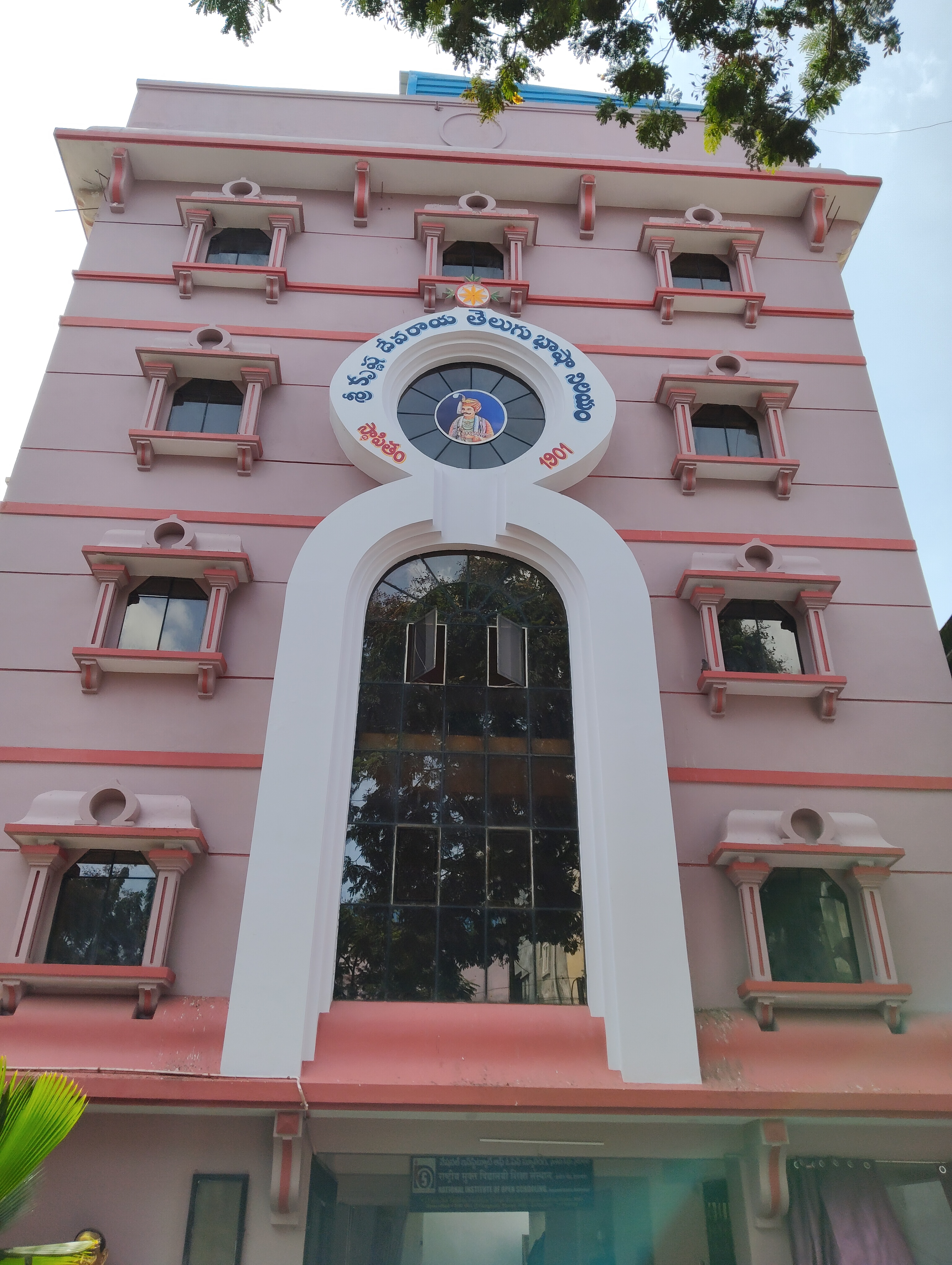
- This is oldest library of Telangana State
- 17.387946466586428°N 78.48646027214616°E
- Location: Sultan Bazar, Hyderabad, India
- Type: State library
- Established: 1901

Collection
- Items collected: books, journals, newspapers, magazines, and manuscripts
- Legal deposit: Yes

Access and use
- Access requirements: Open

Other information
- Website: https://sktbn.org/

Sri Krishna Devaraya Telugu Bhasha Nilayam earlier known as Sri Krishna Devaraya Andhra Bhasha Nilayam is one of the oldest non-Government Library in Telangana.

== History ==
The library was started on 1 September 1901. The Bhasha Nilayam celebrated its silver jubilee in 1927 with Burgula Ramakrishna Rao as its secretary and golden jubilee in 1952 when Burgula became the Chief Minister. The poet laureate Sripada Krishna Sastry inaugurated the golden jubilee celebrations. The Nilayam celebrated its centenary in 2001. Madiraju Lakshmi Narasimha Rao, secretary of the Nilayam for the past over 50 years.

Among the leading personalities involved in the founding and strengthening of this institution in its formative years were the Munagala Raja, Nayani Venkata Ranga Rao, eminent researcher-historian Komarraju Lakshmana Rao, Pardhasarathi Apparao Bahadur of Palwancha, Suravaram Pratapareddy, Madapati Hanumantha Rao, Burgula Ramakrishna Rao, Adiraju Veerabhadra Rao and Raja Bahadur Venkatarama Reddy.

The Bhasha Nilayam was cradle of the nationalist struggle against the Nizam's rule and a center for Telugu language. Great people in politics, literature and culture considered it a privilege to address the gathering here. The influence this library contributed to the network of libraries throughout Telangana. By the Silver Jubilee, seven libraries had been established in Hyderabad and four in Secunderabad. Later, 15 libraries were established in Warangal district, 13 in Nargonda district, 9 in Karimnagar district, 5 in Mahabubnagar district, and one each in Nizamabad and Adilabad districts. These libraries later became important centres of the national movement.

== Collection ==
This library collection comprises approximately 53000 books and magazines, including many rare titles. While a categorized catalogue is available, the library's digitization efforts have progressed slowly. Over the past seven years, only about 10,000 books have been digitized, a pace limited by insufficient funding, staff shortages, and copyright constraints. The Sundarayya Vignana Kendram is helping the library in conservation, automation and electronic catalogueing. Four storied new building is being constructed during the Telugu Desam Party rule by generous Funding from the Government of Andhra Pradesh.

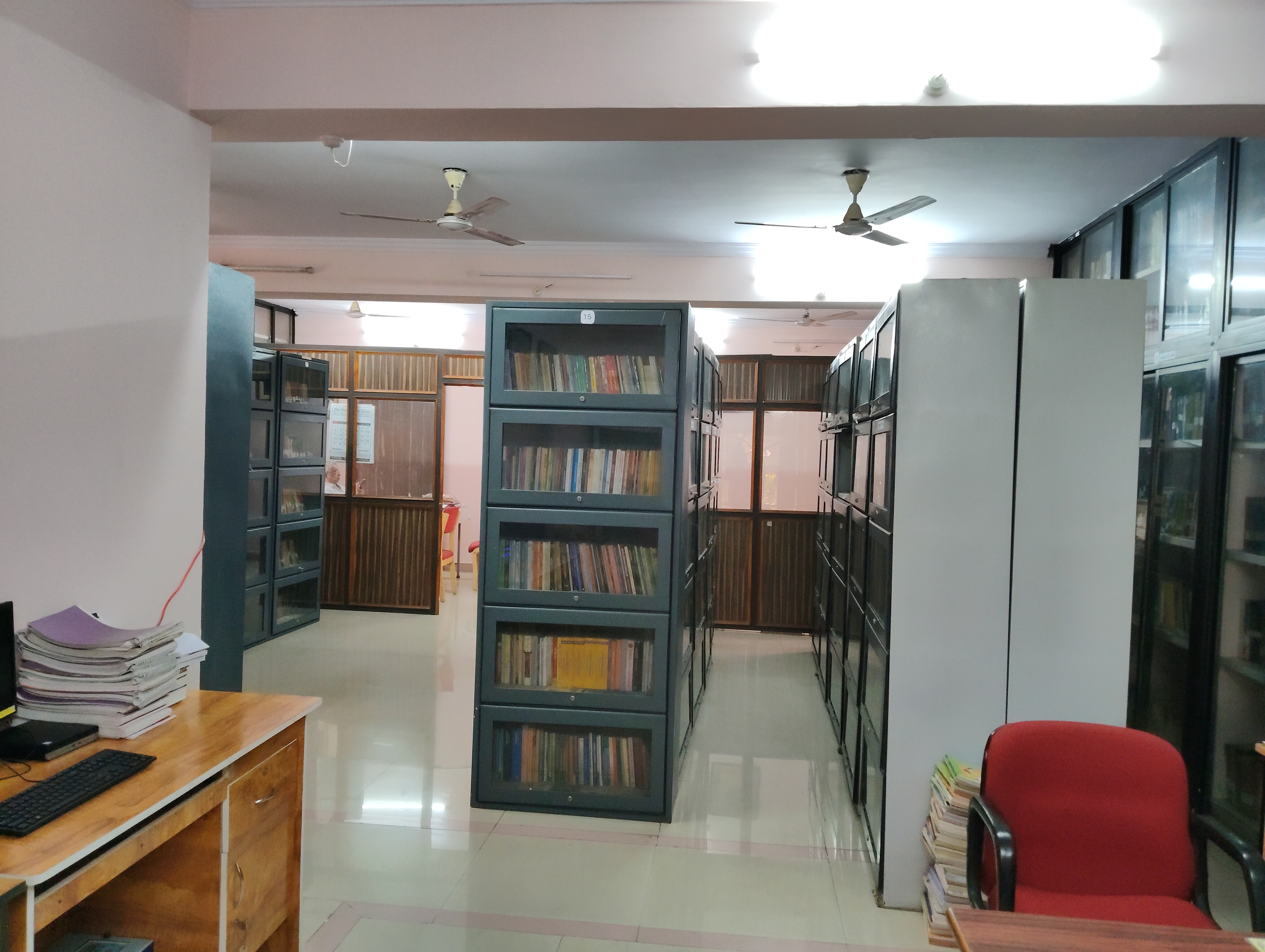
Sri Krishna Devaraya Telugu Bhasha Nilayam Books Rack's

== See also ==
- State Central Library, Hyderabad
