= Samp (disambiguation) =

Samp is dried and partially broken maize kernels.

Samp or SAMP may also refer to:

- Samp (surname)
- Security Attribute Modulation Protocol, a network protocol
- <samp>, an element in Hypertext Markup Language (HTML) for sample output
- SAMP, Sol-Air Moyenne-Portée (French for "Surface-to-Air Medium-Range/Land-based"), French mobile SAM system for air defence
- La Samp, a nickname for UC Sampdoria, an Italian association football club based in Genoa
- (S)-1-amino-2-methoxymethylpyrrolidine, a chiral auxiliary used in the Enders SAMP/RAMP hydrazone-alkylation reaction
- South Asian Microform Project, a program under the Center for Research Libraries
- Samp., taxonomic author abbreviation of Gonçalo Sampaio (1865–1937), Portuguese botanist
