= Digital South Asia Library =

Global collaboration to provide universal access on South Asian topics

The Digital South Asia Library (DSAL) is a global collaboration to provide universal access to materials for reference and research on South Asian topics, utilizing digital technologies, to scholars, public officials, business leaders, and other users.

Participants in the Digital South Asia Library include leading U.S. universities, led by the University of Chicago, the Center for Research Libraries, the South Asia Microform Project, the Committee on South Asian Libraries and Documentation, the Association for Asian Studies, the Library of Congress, the Asia Society, American Institute of Indian Studies, the British Library, the University of Oxford, the University of Cambridge, the Sundarayya Vignana Kendram in India, Madan Puraskar Pustakalaya in Nepal, and other institutions in South Asia.

== Funding ==
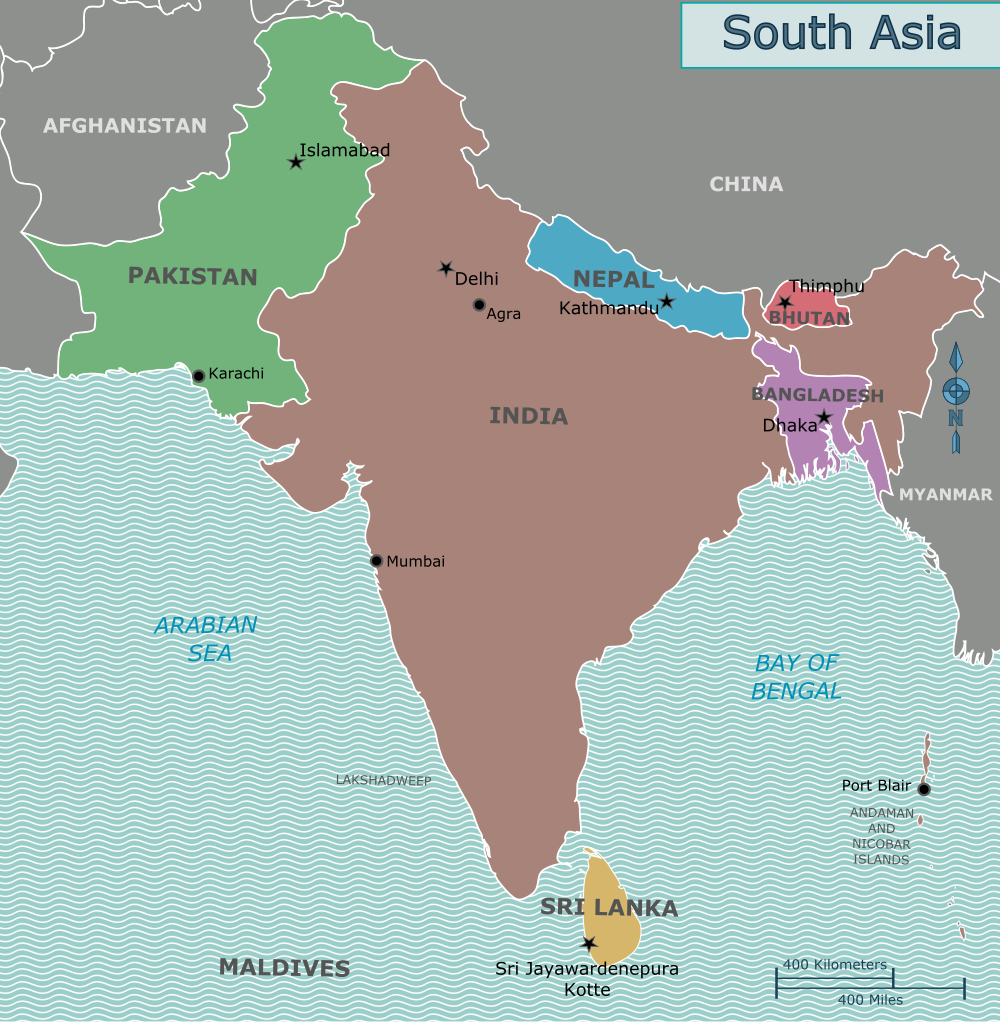
Contemporary political map of South Asia

This project builds upon a two-year pilot project funded by the Association of Research Libraries' Global Resources Program with support from The Andrew W. Mellon Foundation. The United States Department of Education has provided support through four grants under the Technological Innovation and Cooperation for Foreign Information Access (TICFIA) program and two grants under the International Research and Studies (IRS) program. A grant from the Ford Foundation made possible the formation of the South Asia Union Catalogue, a subordinate program under the Digital South Asia Library.

== Related projects ==
- "List of digital dictionaries", Digital Dictionaries of South Asia website
- South Asia Union Catalogue
- South Asian Microform Project
