= Earls Colne =

Village in Essex, England

Coordinates: 51.928°N 0.702°E

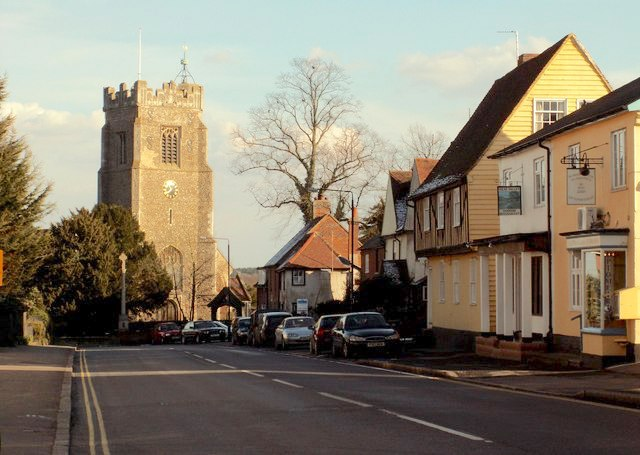

- Location within Essex
- Population: 3,971 (Parish, 2021)
- OS grid reference: TL857289
- District: Braintree
- Shire county: Essex
- Region: East
- Country: England
- Sovereign state: United Kingdom
- Post town: Colchester
- Postcode district: CO6
- Dialling code: 01787
- Police: Essex
- Fire: Essex
- Ambulance: East of England
- UK Parliament: Braintree
- Website: www.earlscolne.org

Earls Colne is a village and civil parish in Essex, England. It is named after the River Colne, on which it stands, and the Earls of Oxford who held the manor of Earls Colne from before 1086 to 1703. At the 2021 census the parish had a population of 3,971.

== History ==
=== Manor of Earls Colne ===
In the time of Edward the Confessor Earls Colne belonged to a Saxon noble named Wulfwine, also recorded as Ulwin or Ulwine. Ulwin's whole estate was given to Aubrey de Vere by William the Conqueror. His grandson Aubrey de Vere III became the first Earl of Oxford in the mid-twelfth century.

The Earls had an ancient mansion called Hall Place standing near the site of the present Ashwells in Park Lane.

Edward de Vere, 17th Earl of Oxford mismanaged his finances and in 1583 the estate, then comprising the manor and park of seven hundred acres, were purchased from him by his steward Richard Harlakenden.

=== Village records ===
Earls Colne is one of the best recorded villages in the UK and has been the subject of a study undertaken between 1972 and 2002 by Professor Alan Macfarlane and his team from the Department of Social Anthropology at the University of Cambridge.

The resulting database contains a large part of the surviving records of the parish over the period 1380–1854. The manorial records have been transcribed from Latin and these together with the parish registers, tithe maps and Ralph Josselin's diary have been indexed by place, person and date.

=== R. Hunt and Company Limited – Atlas Works ===
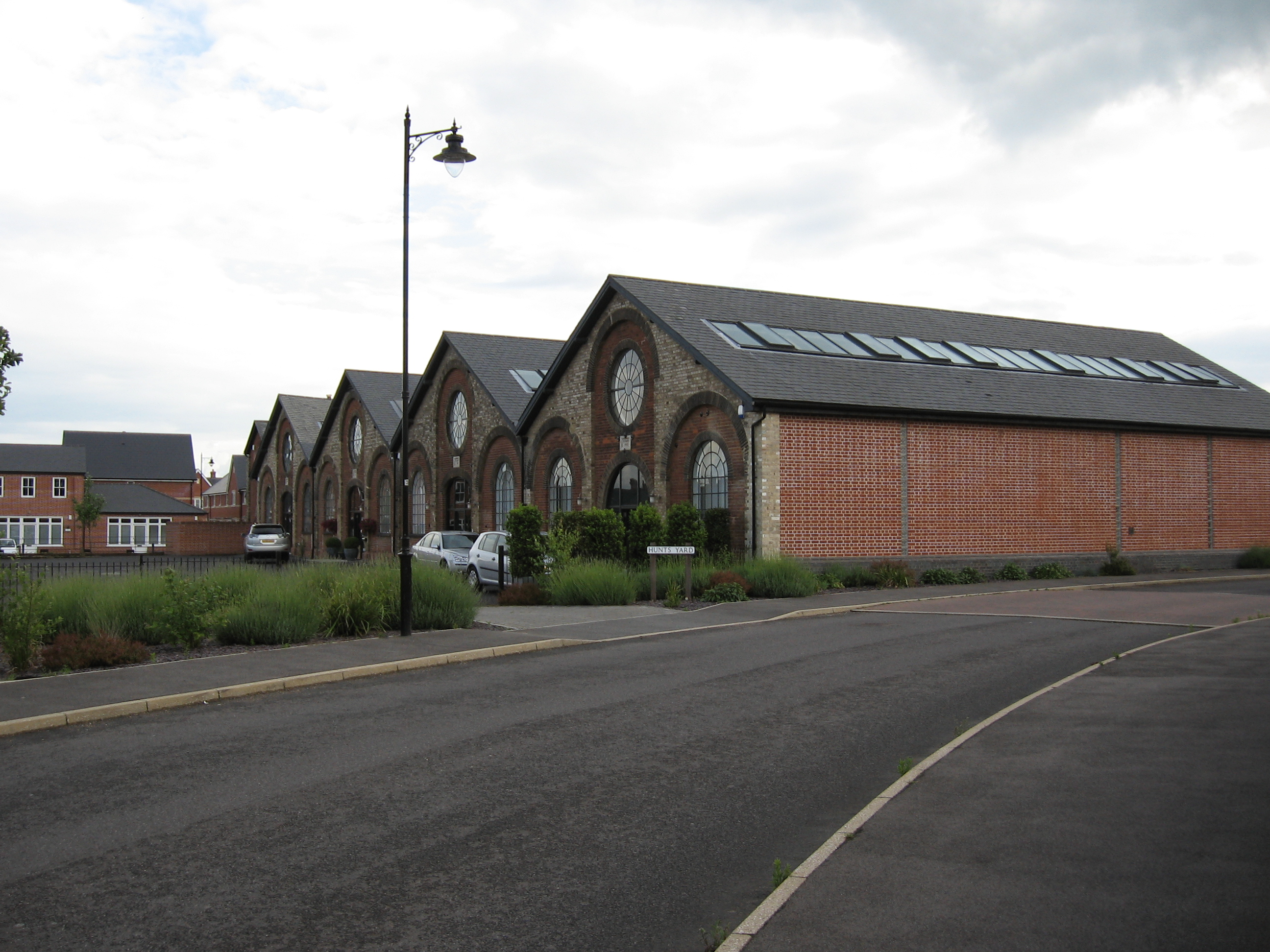
The Atlas Works buildings have been refurbished into residential.

In 1824 Robert Hunt, a millwright from Soham in Cambridgeshire, settled in Earls Colne and set up a millwrighting and wheelwrighting shop and smithy at what was to become the Atlas Works.

The business soon gained a local reputation for making general agricultural equipment, and after exhibiting products at the Royal Agricultural Show in 1851 the company's products gained a country-wide recognition.

After Robert Hunt's death the firm was carried on by his surviving son Reuben Hunt and grew to become the major employer in the village, by 1900 employing approximately half of the male working population of the village.

When Sir R. H. Hunt, the founder's grandson, died in 1970, the firm was still the village's chief employer with some 300 employees and works covering 10 acres (4.0 ha). However the business subsequently declined and The Atlas Works were closed in 1988.

=== Earls Colne Industrial Co-operative Society ===
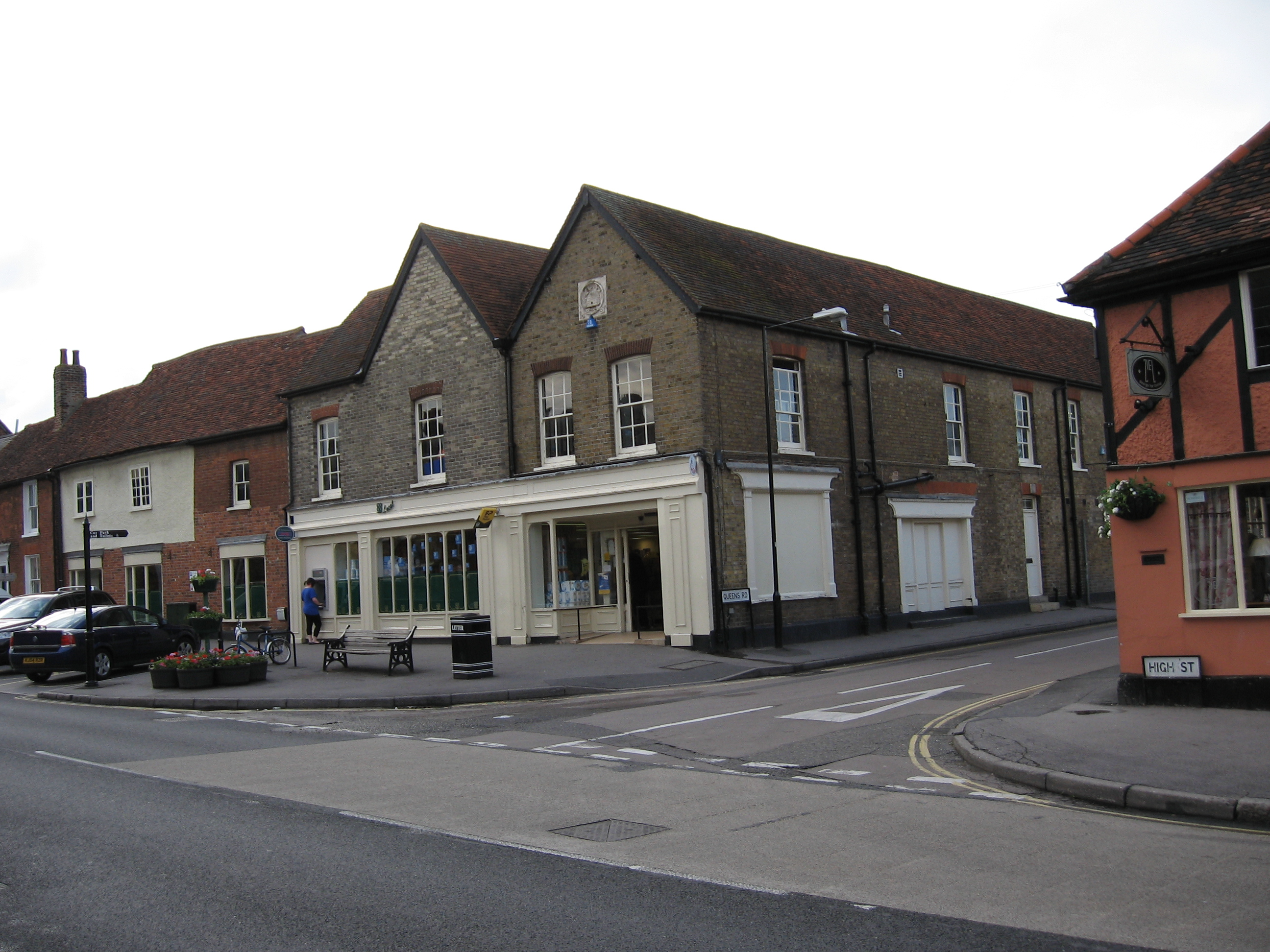
Co-op building

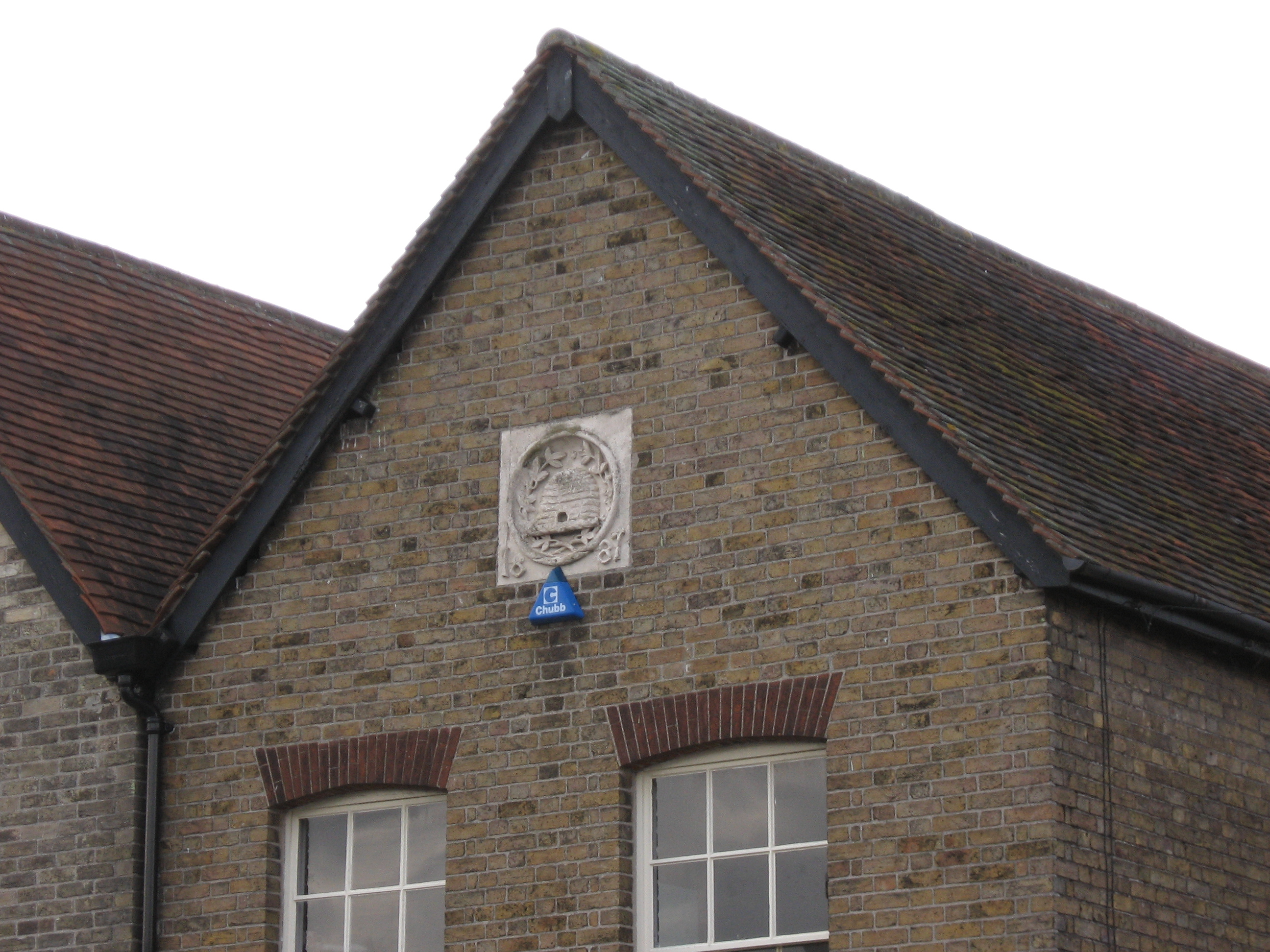
Co-op building detail

Central to late nineteenth and early twentieth century life in the village was the Earls Colne Industrial and Co-operative Society. The Earls Colne Co-op was one of the last remaining independent village co-operative societies in Essex and Suffolk, finally merging with the far larger Colchester and East Essex society in 1970. The Earls Colne Co-op was founded in 1884 in the front room of a cottage in High Street.

The current store occupies a building dating to between 1480 and 1510, the roof timbers being preserved and exposed in-store to enable the public to appreciate the method of construction.

== Landmarks ==
The Earls Colne Heritage Museum occupies The Old Water Tower, Reuben Hunt Walk which was the former water tower of the Atlas Works, the home of R Hunt & Company. The main sections of the permanent exhibition comprise Earls Colne in Earliest Times, the Domesday Book, Colne Priory, The Earls of Oxford, The 1598 Map by Israel Amyce, The Diary of the Reverend Ralph Josselin, Other notable Earls Colne residents of the past, The Victorian Era, The Atlas Works and the Hunt Family, and The Second World War.

== Education ==
In 1520 the Reverend Christopher Swallow gave lands to the Earl of Oxford for the founding of a school for the instruction of thirty children. Earls Colne Grammar School originally occupied a site in Lower Holt Street, but moved to premises in York Road which were opened on 12 September 1893. The School was closed in 1975 when it was amalgamated into The Ramsey School (now The Ramsey Academy) in Halstead as part of the re-organisation of schooling along comprehensive lines.

== Religion ==
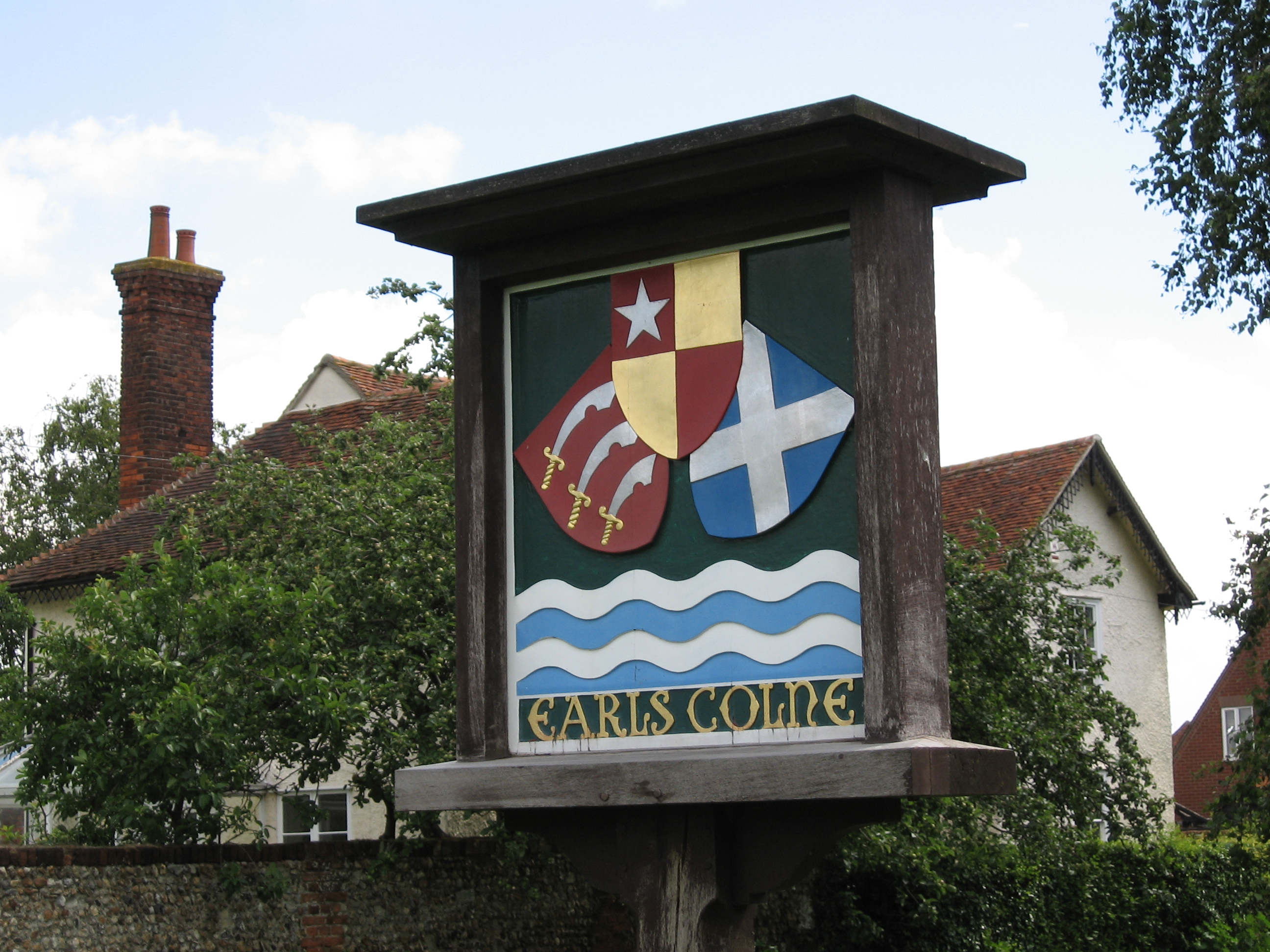
Village sign of Earls Colne

A monastery, Colne Priory, was founded in the parish by Aubrey de Vere I in about 1103-4 and was dedicated to St Mary and St John the Evangelist for monks of the Benedictine order from Abingdon Abbey, Berkshire. The monastery was surrendered to Henry VIII by Robert Abel, the prior, on 3 July 1534.

The parish church is dedicated to Saint Andrew. The date of the original church is not known but is probably earlier than 1100. The current church was built between 1313 and 1360; the present tower was started in 1460 and completed in 1534.

A notable vicar of the parish was Ralph Josselin, who was instituted in 1641 and held the post until his death in 1683. Josselin was a diarist and his published diary has been said to rival, with a rural perspective, that of Samuel Pepys from a similar period.

== Transport ==
Earls Colne Airfield, which is situated approximately 1-mile (1.6 km) south-southwest of the village, was a bomber station used by the RAF and USAAF between 1942 and 1946. It is now a golf course, business park and UK and civilian airfield for light aviation.

There is a regular bus service (88) linking Earls Colne with Colchester and Halstead.

== Notable people and events ==
- Thomas Audley (1488–1544), 1st Baron Audley of Walden, Lord Chancellor to Henry VIII of England
- Reverend Thomas Shepard (1605–1649), assistant schoolmaster at Earls Colne Grammar School who subsequently emigrated and became a founder of Harvard University
- Reverend Ralph Josselin (1616–1683), vicar, diarist
- Sir Thomas Fowell Buxton (1786–1845), 1st Baronet, MP and campaigner for the 1833 Act abolishing slavery in the British Colonies
- Sir Edwin Manton (1909–2005), collector of the works of John Constable and multimillion-pound donor to the Tate Gallery in London.

== Images ==
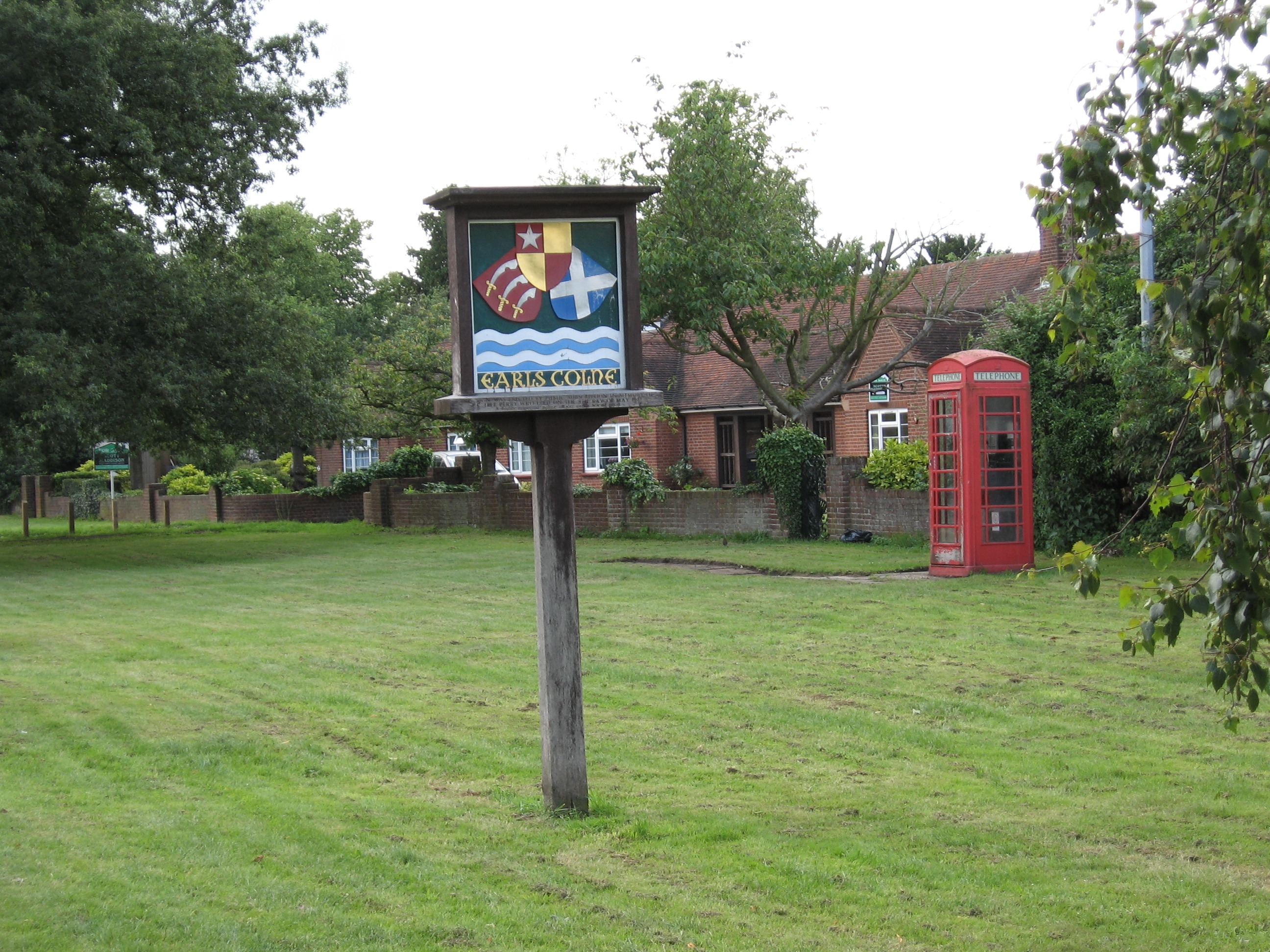
Red telephone box in Earls Colne along High Street

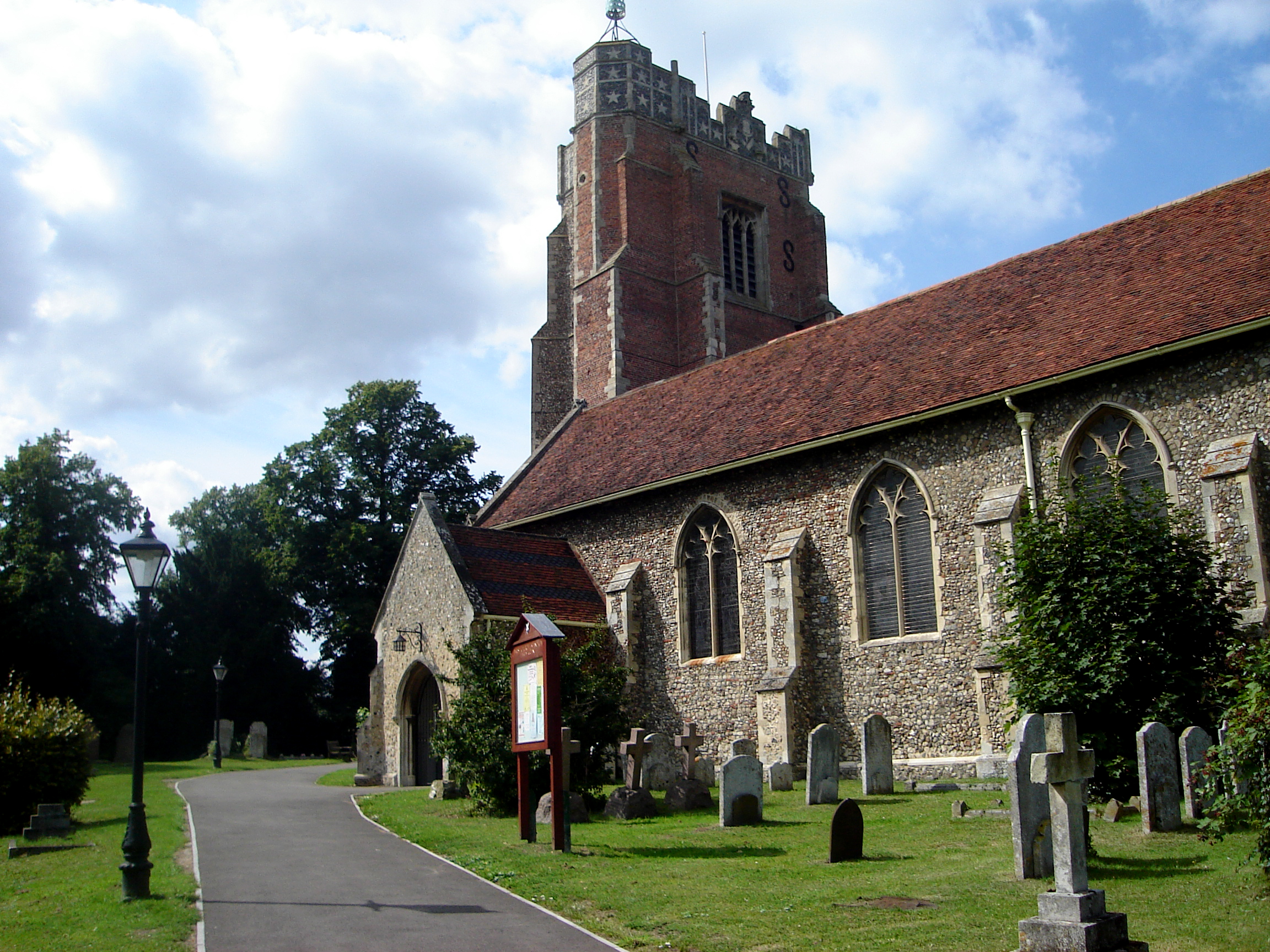
St Andrew's Church, Earls Colne

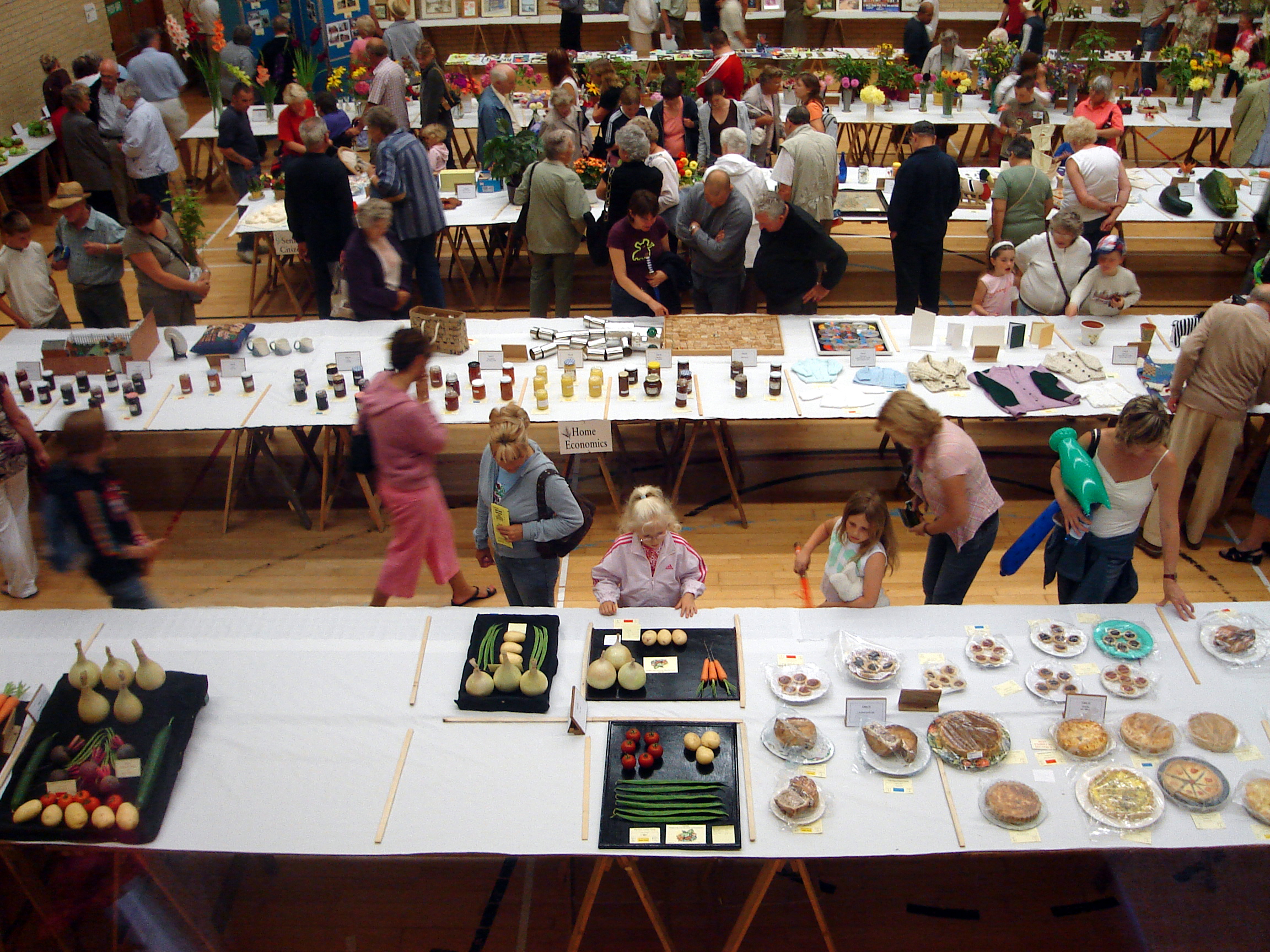
The Four Colnes Show 2005

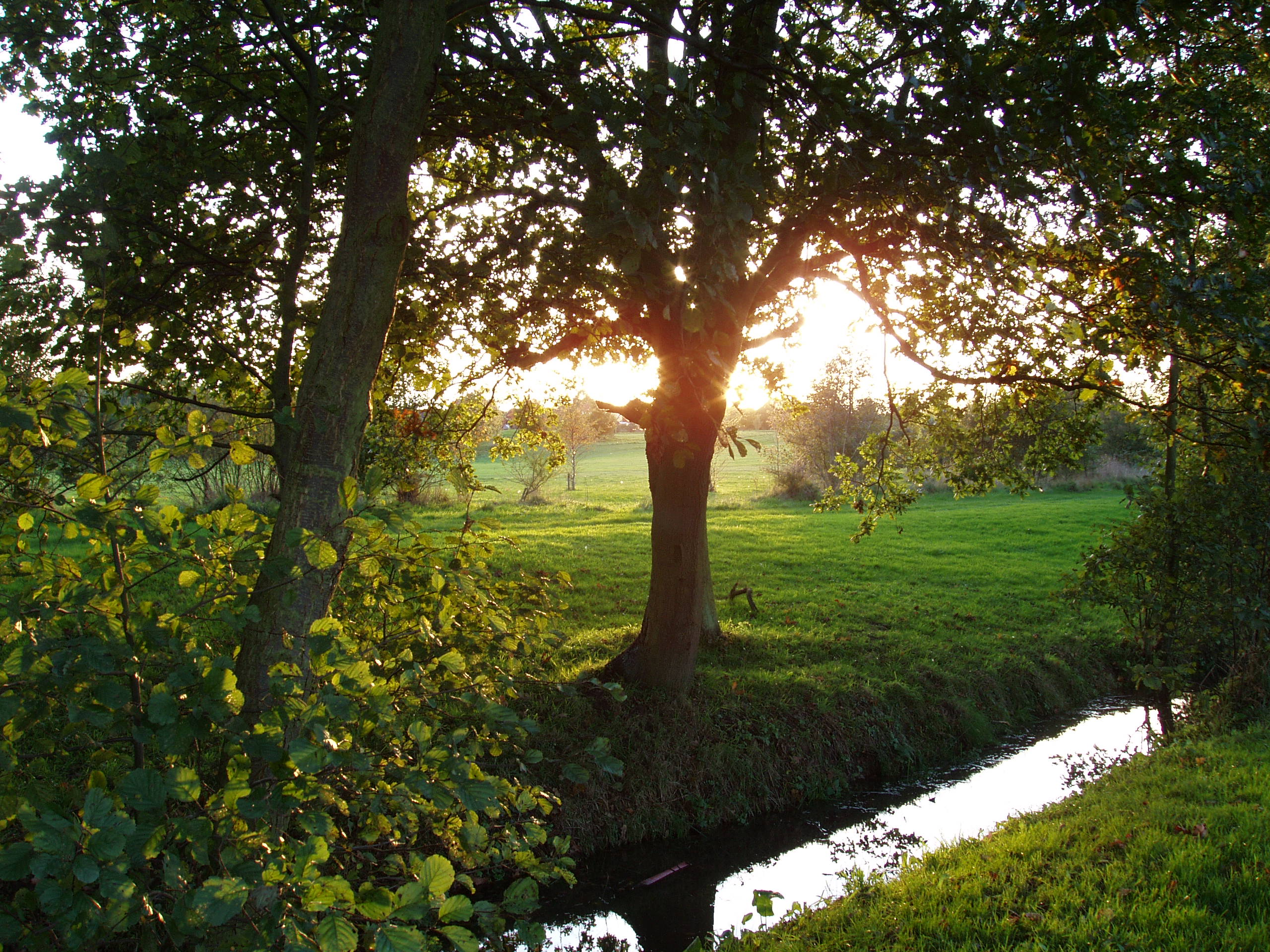
The Colne Valley Golf Course at Sunset
