= Alan Macfarlane =

British anthropologist & historian

Alan Macfarlane FBA FRHistS
- Born: 20 December 1941 (age 84); Shillong, Colonial Assam, British India
- Education: Worcester College, University of Oxford (BA, MA, DPhil); London School of Economics and Political Science (MPhil); School of Oriental and African Studies (PhD)
- Known for: The Origins of English Individualism
- Scientific career
- Fields: Anthropology; History
- Workplaces: King's College, University of Cambridge
- Thesis: Witchcraft prosecutions in Essex, 1560–1680 (1967)
- Doctoral advisor: Keith Thomas
- Website: alanmacfarlane.com

Alan Donald James Macfarlane FBA FRHistS (born 20 December 1941) is a British anthropologist and historian, and a Professor Emeritus of King's College, Cambridge. He is the author or editor of 20 books and numerous articles on the anthropology and history of England, Nepal, Japan and China. He has focused on comparative study of the origins and nature of the modern world. In recent years he has become increasingly interested in the use of visual material in teaching and research. He is a Fellow of the British Academy and the Royal Historical Society.

== Early life ==
Macfarlane was born into a British family of tea planters in Colonial Assam in northeast India. He was born in Ganesh Das Hospital in the hill station of Shillong, at the time the capital of undivided Assam and now the capital of Meghalaya. His father "Mac" Macfarlane was also a reserve officer of the Assam Rifles, besides being a tea planter, and his mother was the author Iris Macfarlane. The family lived in various tea estates in both Upper Assam and Lower Assam, in the Brahmaputra valley.

== Career ==
Macfarlane was educated at the Dragon School, Oxford and Sedbergh School. He then read modern history at Worcester College, University of Oxford, from 1960 to 1963, completing a Bachelor of Arts degree, and went on to his Master of Arts and Doctor of Philosophy on Witchcraft prosecutions in Essex, 1560–1680: A Sociological Analysis degrees, in 1967. He also completed a Master of Philosophy degree in anthropology on "The regulation of marital and sexual relationships in 17th century England" at the London School of Economics in 1968 and a second doctorate in anthropology on "Population and resources in central Nepal" in 1972 at the School of Oriental and African Studies of the University of London.

He went on to be a research fellow in history at King's College, University of Cambridge. In 1975, he was appointed lecturer in social anthropology at the University of Cambridge, becoming a reader in historical anthropology in 1981 and then a full professor of anthropological science and personal chair in 1991. He became emeritus professor of anthropological science at the University of Cambridge and a life fellow of King's College, Cambridge in 2009. Macfarlane received the Huxley Memorial Medal, the highest honour of the Royal Anthropological Institute in 2012.

=== Anthropological interests ===
Macfarlane's first major publication, in 1970, was Witchcraft in Tudor and Stuart England, a historical study of the conditions that gave rise to English witchcraft beliefs. His approach drew on the work of classic functionalist anthropologists Edward Evans-Pritchard and Lucy Mair. Also in 1970, Macfarlane published The Family Life of Ralph Josselin, a study of the diary of a famous seventeenth-century clergyman. His approach here, exploring the emotions, fears and relationships of an individual to attempt a historical study of private life in seventeenth century England, was reminiscent of the Annales School.

Macfarlane has undertaken several periods of ethnographic field research, the first of these a period in Nepal with the Gurung people. He used this period as the foundation of a 1976 study, Resources and Population a Malthusian analysis of Gurung responses to scarce resources and an expanding population. Following Malthus' demographic principles, Macfarlane warned that the Gurung might experience a 'population check' in coming decades.

=== Historical interests ===
Macfarlane has published extensively on English history, advancing the idea that many traits of so-called "modern society" appeared in England long before the period of modernity as defined by historians, such as Lawrence Stone. Drawing loosely on work by Max Weber, Macfarlane has contrasted the defining characteristics of modern and traditional society. His 1987 book The Culture of Capitalism is a non-deterministic study of the emergence of modernity and capitalism in Western Europe. Two further books, The Origins of English Individualism (1978) and Marriage and Love in England (1986), explore the way English family institutions and social life emerged distinctly from continental European institutions and experiences.

During the 1990s, Macfarlane was invited to lecture in Japan, initiating a period of research into the distinctive emergence of modernity in Japan by contrast to England and Europe. 1997's The Savage Wars of Peace returned to Macfarlane's early interest in Malthus and demographics, comparing the modernity experiences of England and Japan. The book argues that England and Japan, both relatively large but non-remote islands, were each positioned to develop an autonomous culture while still profiting from nearby continental influence. Through different means, both Japan and England overcame the Malthusian trap, keeping birth and mortality rates under control, thus providing a demographic impetus for the rise of capitalism and prosperity. Macfarlane wrote an entire book dedicated to Japan published in 2007, Japan Through the Looking Glass.

== Literary works and collaborations ==
Macfarlane's work on modernity acknowledges his Enlightenment roots. His Riddle of the Modern World (2000) and Making of the Modern World (2001) are contributions to the field of history of ideas, addressing the work of Montesquieu, Adam Smith, Alexis de Tocqueville, Ernest Gellner, Yukichi Fukuzawa and Frederic Maitland.

Another strand in his work addresses the role of particular inventions in transforming history. The Glass Bathyscaphe: How Glass Changed the World (2002), co-authored with Gerry Martin, discusses how the invention and use of glass facilitated European dominion overseas. Macfarlane and his mother Iris co-wrote Green Gold: The Empire of Tea (2003), presenting the thesis that tea contributed to English prosperity, preventing epidemics by requiring the boiling of water and by promoting antibiotic effects.

2005's Letters to Lily distils Macfarlane's reflections on a life of research, as addressed to his granddaughter Lily Bee. As a non-academic work it brought Macfarlane to the attention of a wider, non-scholarly audience.

Macfarlane's work has been widely read and cited by his contemporaries. Critics have challenged the role he ascribes to English institutions in the establishment of modernity, and his moral relativism as a champion of modernity who nonetheless affirms the validity of non-Western institutions.

Together with Mark Turin, Macfarlane established the Digital Himalaya Project in December 2000 and now serves as chairman of the executive board of the World Oral Literature Project. He is also a co-editor of The Fortnightly Review's "new series" online.

== Publications ==
- Witchcraft in Tudor and Stuart England: A Regional and Comparative Study, Routledge & Kegan Paul, Abingdon-on-Thames, 1970, 334 p. ISBN 978-0415196116 (second edition, Routledge, 1999, 380 p.)
- The Family Life of Ralph Josselin: A Seventeenth Century Clergyman - An Essay in Historical Anthropology, Cambridge University Press, 1970, 241 p. ISBN 978-0521077071
- Resources and Population: A Study of the Gurungs of Nepal, Cambridge University Press, 1976, 382 p. ISBN 978-0521209137
- Reconstructing Historical Communities in collaboration with Sarah Harrison and Charles Jardine, Cambridge University Press, 1977, 222 p. ISBN 978-0521217965
- The Origins of English Individualism: The Family, Property and Social Transition, Blackwell, Oxford, 1978, 236 p. ISBN 978-0631193104 (translated in Portuguese, Japanese, Hungarian, and Chinese)
- The Justice and the Mare's Ale: Law and Disorder in Seventeenth-century England with Sarah Harrison, Blackwell, Oxford 1981, 238 p. ISBN 978-0631126812
- A Guide to English Historical Records, Cambridge University Press, 1983, 134 p. ISBN 978-0521252256
- Marriage and Love in England: Modes of Reproduction 1300-1840, Blackwell, Oxford, 1986, 320 p. ISBN 978-0631139928
- The Culture of Capitalism, Blackwell, Oxford, 1987, 272 p. ISBN 978-0631136262 (translated in Portuguese, Japanese, Spanish, and Turkish)
- The Diary of Ralph Josselin: 1616-1683, Oxford University Press, 1991, 752 p. ISBN 978-0197259559
- Gurungs of Nepal: A Guide to the Gurungs with Indrabahadur Gurung, Ratna Pustak Bhandar, Kathmandu, 1992, 74 p. ASIN B0006EYPPG (the text can found on the author's website)
- The Savage Wars of Peace: England, Japan and the Malthusian Trap, Blackwell, Oxford, 1997, 448 p. ISBN 978-1403904324 (a full version is available on the author's website) (translated in Japan in 2001)
- The Riddle of the Modern World: Of Liberty, Wealth and Equality, Palgrave Macmillan, Basingstoke, 2000, 344 p. ISBN 978-0333792704
- The Making of the Modern World: Visions from the West and East, Palgrave Macmillan, Basingstoke, 2002, 336 p. ISBN 978-0333964460
- The Glass Bathyscaphe: How Glass Changed the World with Gerry Martin, Profile Books, London, 2002, 305 p. (three editions) ISBN 9781847651013 (published in the US as Glass : A World History, University of Chicago Press, 2002, 288 p. ISBN 978-0226500287) (translated in Italian, Chinese, German, Spanish, and Chinese (complex))
- Green Gold: The Empire of Tea with Iris Macfarlane, Ebury Press, London, 2003, 320 p. ISBN 978-0091883096 (translated in Italian, Spanish, Chinese (complex), and Japanese)
- Letters To Lily: On How the World Works, Profile Books, London, 2006, 320 p. ISBN 9781861977809 (translated in Korean, Japanese, Finnish, Norwegian (Swedish, Danish), Chinese (complex), Chinese, Slovenian, and Hungarian)
- Japan Through the Looking Glass: Shaman to Shinto, Profile Books, London, 2007, 288 p. ISBN 978-1861979674 (translated in French, Finnish, Italian, and Chinese)
- Reflections on Cambridge, Social Science Press, New Delhi, 2009, 243 p. ISBN 978-81-87358-48-0 (translated in Chinese)
- The Invention of the Modern World, Odd Volumes (The Fortnightly Review, New Series), London, 2014, 334 p. ISBN 978-0615919638
- China, Japan, Europe and the Anglo-sphere, A Comparative Analysis, Cambridge Rivers Publishing, Cambridge, April 2018, 258 p. ISBN 978-1912603268
- Dragon Days: The Dragon School, Oxford, 1949-1955, CreateSpace Independent Publishing, 2013, with James Bruce Lockhart ISBN 978-1492129400

As editor The Gurungs: A Himalayan Population of Nepal by Bernard Pignede with Sarah Harrison, Ratna Pustak Bhandar, Kathmandu, 1993, 523 p. ASIN B00B79CVSC
As contributor The Nagas: Hill Peoples of Northeast India - Society, Culture and the Colonial Encounter by Julian Jacobs with Sarah Harrison and Anita Herle, Thames and Hudson, London, 1990, 356 p. ISBN 0500973881

=== Major Thinkers Series ===
Following and expanding The Making of the Modern World: Visions from the West and East

- Yukichi Fukazawa and the Making of the Modern World, 2002, 97 p. (the text is available on this page)
- F.W. Maitland and the Making of the Modern World, 2002, 102 p. (the text is available on this page)
- Thomas Malthus and the Making of the Modern World, 2002, 138 p. (the text is available on this page)
- Montesquieu and the Making of the Modern World, 2013, 55 p. (the text is available on this page)
- Alexis de Tocqueville and the Making of the Modern World, 2013, 92 p. (the text is available on this page)
- Adam Smith and the Making of the Modern World, 2013, 69 p. (the text is available on this page)
- Four Approaches to the Making of the Modern World, CreateSpace Independent Publishing Platform, Silicon Valley 2018, 110 p. ISBN 978-1986028660

=== How We Understand the World Series ===
Inspired by and continuing Letters To Lily: On How the World Works also addressed to younger persons of the author's and author's friends' families.

- How to Discover the World - Reflections for Rosa, Cambridge Rivers Publishing, Cambridge, Mars 2018, 96 p. ISBN 978-1912603206 (translated in Chinese)
- How To Understand Each Other - Notes for Nina, Cambridge Rivers Publishing, Cambridge, Mars 2018, 96 p. ISBN 978-1912603237 (translated in Chinese)
- Intelligent Machines - Conversations with Gerry, Cambridge Rivers Publishing, Cambridge, Mars 2018, 192 p. ISBN 978-1912603251
- Learning to be Modern - Jottings for James, Cam Rivers Publishing, Cambridge, Mars 2018, 88 p. ISBN 978-1912603244
- A Modern Education - Advice for Ariston, Cam Rivers Publishing, Cambridge, Mars 2018, 168 p. ISBN 978-1912603176
- How Do We Know - Advice for April, Cambridge Rivers Publishing, Cambridge, Mars 2018, 136 p. ISBN 978-1912603190 (translated in Chinese)
- How To Investigate Mysteries - Secrets for Sam, Cambridge Rivers Publishing, Cambridge, Mars 2018, 84 p. ISBN 978-1912603213 (translated in Chinese)
- How to Study the World - Suggestions for Shuo, Cambridge Rivers Publishing, Cambridge, April 2018, 120 p. ISBN 978-1912603220 (translated in Chinese)
- How Can We Survive - Thoughts for Taras, Cambridge Rivers Publishing, Cambridge, April 2018, 124 p. ISBN 978-1912603183 (translated in Chinese)

=== Other essays ===
- Encounters with Japan and the Japanese, CreateSpace Independent Publishing Platform, Silicon Valley, 2013, 256 p. ISBN 978-1491075418
- King's College Cambridge, a personal view with Patricia McGuire, Cambridge Rivers Publishing, Cambridge, July 2018, 56 p. ISBN 978-1912603275
- (unpublished) Robert Chambers of Edinburgh as 'assistant' of Iris Macfarlane available on the author's own site

As editor The Education of Iris Macfarlane 1922-1939 by Iris Macfarlane, CreateSpace Independent Publishing Platform, Silicon Valley, July 2018, 234 p. ISBN 978-1722269296 (the text is available on this page)

== Selected lectures ==
- Family, Marriage and Kinship - How They Work (1983)
- Lectures on Great Social Thinkers (2001)
