= Digital Himalaya =

Digital preservation project

Logo of the Digital Himalaya project

The Digital Himalaya project was established in December 2000 by Mark Turin, Alan Macfarlane, Sara Shneiderman, and Sarah Harrison. The project's principal goal is to collect and preserve historical multimedia materials relating to the Himalaya, such as photographs, recordings, and journals, and make those resources available over the internet and offline, on external storage media. The project team has digitized older ethnographic collections and data sets that were deteriorating in their analogue formats, to protect them from deterioration and make them available and accessible to originating communities in the Himalayan region and a global community of scholars.

The project was founded at the Department of Anthropology of the University of Cambridge, moved to Cornell University in 2002 (when a collaboration with the University of Virginia was initiated), and then back to the University of Cambridge in 2005. From 2011 to 2014, the project was jointly hosted between the University of Cambridge and Yale University. In 2014, the project moved to the University of British Columbia, where it is presently located, and maintains a distant collaboration with Sichuan University.

== Project team ==
Digital Himalaya has a team of nine individuals who work together to develop user-friendly and accessible online resources:

- Sarah Harrison
- Daniel Ho
- Hikmat Khadka
- Wachiraporn Klungthanaboon
- Alan Macfarlane
- Pragyajan Rai (Yalamber)
- Sara Shneiderman
- Komintal Thami
- Mark Turin

The project is supported by an active international Advisory Board, including the following individuals:

- General Sir Sam Cowan
- Richard Feldman
- [Martin Gaenszle
- Ann Gammie
- David Germano
- Mark Goodridge
- David Holmberg
- Michael Hutt
- Kathryn March
- Christina Monson

Since its establishment, the Digital Himalaya project has benefited from skilled student interns and research assistants in Canada, Nepal, the United Kingdom, and the United States.

== Funding ==
For the first five years of active development, Digital Himalaya was successful in receiving competitive grants from many organizations. Once the site was launched and most of the collections were digitized and accessible, it became increasingly difficult to find resources to maintain the online collections. The project still receives support through donations from individuals and foundations, in addition to experimenting with small referral commissions through Amazon.

Financial and institutional partners:

- The Technological Innovation and Cooperation for Foreign Information Access (TICFIA) Program, US Department of Education
- Cornell Institute for Digital Collections, Cornell University
- East Asia Program, Cornell University
- Department of Asian Studies, Cornell University with supplemental support through the Freeman Foundation Undergraduate Initiative
- Department of Anthropology, Cornell University
- The Oxford Bön Project
- The British Academy (Small Research Grant)
- Anthropologists' Fund for Urgent Anthropological Research at the Royal Anthropological Institute
- Frederick Williamson Memorial Fund
- The Crowther Beynon Fund, University of Cambridge Museum of Archaeology and Anthropology
- The Renaissance Trust
- The Brendish Family Foundation
- The Sager Family Traveling Foundation and Roadshow
- The Department of Social Anthropology, University of Cambridge
- SIT Study Abroad
- Rashmi and Sanjay Shrestha
- Andrew Clark and Mary Cobb
- John R. Sanderson
- Christina Monson
- Dr. Mary Shepherd Slusser
- venturethree

== Collections ==
The Digital Himalaya archive has more than 200,000 pages of scanned texts, hundreds of hours of video and audio, over 1,000 maps, and a large collection of original ethnographic content. The project has digitised an extensive set of back issues of Himalayan journals and maps. There are currently 13 collections available, and the newest addition to the archive is a collection of bird reports from Nepal.

=== Birds of Nepal ===
Thanks to Tim Inskipp and Carol Inskipp, this collection has 2,155 references on birds in Nepal available to the public, dated from 1975 to 1999. The archive contains multiple sources, from books and scientific papers to published and unpublished reports, offering a valuable source for researchers interested in Himalayan bird populations.

=== Census of Nepal 2001 ===
This collection contains census data from the National Census of Nepal 2001. The Digital Himalaya team sorted the data for Nepal's 75 districts and their VDCs (Village Development Committee), making this public data available for any user to search and download.

=== Fürer-Haimendorf Film Collection ===
This collection contains interviews with Professor Christoph von Fürer-Haimendorf and footage of his research in the Himalaya. Fürer-Haimendorf was an Austrian anthropologist based at the University of London who travelled across much of the Himalayan region and conducted field research with Naga communities in India and Sherpa communities in Nepal. The full collection is hosted at the School of Oriental and African Studies (SOAS).

=== Films ===
Digital Himalaya is continuously expanding its online collections to include both historical and contemporary film and video. Below is a list of films available through the project's archive:

- Returned: Child Soldiers of Nepal's Maoist Army
- Shining Spirit Project
- Tendong Lho Rum Faat
- Wutu Collection
- Punam
- Journey of a Red Fridge
- Journey from Zanskar
- The Way of the Road
- Angel of the Aboriginals
- Glance of Genius: The life and work of B.H. Hodgson
- Minhe Mangghuer Torch Festival
- Alama Ritual
- A Tribute to Christoph and Betty von Fürer-Haimendorf
- Nadun Festival
- Danba
- I Will Find You
- Hidden Treasure of Bön
- Carter Holton Film Collection
- Hindu-Vidyapeeth schools
- Len yi Tibetan Village
- Voices of Nepal

=== Journals of Himalayan Studies ===
Digital Himalaya archives contain scanned copies of many journals, magazines, and publications of Himalayan studies for free download. Here is a list of available titles:

- Ancient Nepal
- Asian Highland Perspectives
- Ādarśa
- The Bhutan Review
- Britain-Nepal Society Journal
- Bulletin of Tibetology
- Carter Center
- Center for Constitutional Dialogue
- Chowkidar
- Contributions to Nepalese Studies
- Crisis Group
- Doon Library Newsletter
- European Bulletin of Himalayan Research
- Gochali
- Himal
- Himal Southasian
- Himalayan Journal of Sciences
- Hot Nepal
- International IDEA
- Isilim
- Journal of Bhutan Studies
- Journal of the International Association for Bon Research
- Journal of Newar Studies
- Journal of the Tibet Society
- Kailash
- Martin Chautari Policy Briefs
- Midweek
- Mother Tongue Pipal Pustak
- Mulyankan
- Nation Weekly
- Nepalese Translation
- Nepalese Linguistics
- Nepali Aawaz
- Nepali Times
- Newsfront
- Occasional Papers in Sociology and Anthropology
- Ogmios
- Postal Himal
- Peace and Democracy in South Asia
- Pūrṇimā
- Raven
- Read
- Regmi Research Series
- Revue d'Études Tibétaines
- Rhythm of Bya Chu
- Shezoed: Rigzhung Research Journal
- Samaya
- Saptahik
- Sharada
- Shikshak
- Spotlight

=== Maps ===
The web-based map collection includes:

- Himalayan Maps
- Nepal Maps
- Himalayan Atlas of Aerial Panoramas
- Great Himalayan Trail Dolpo Map
- Great Himalayan Trail Route Map of Nepal
- Manaslu Circuit Trekking Map
- Illustrated Atlas of the Himalayas
- UN Nepal Map Information Platform

=== Music and audio from the Himalayas ===
The Digital Himalaya music and audio archive includes:

- Songs and Traditions from Laya, Bhutan
- Thangmi songs from Nepal (Reng Patangko Collection)
- Yari Aso's songs
- Mangghuer Folktale Literature
- Songs from Gcig sgril County, from Qinghai Province
- Jizong collection, from Sichuan
- Minyak collection, from Sichuan
- Songs from Tha Rgyas, in Tibet
- Songs from Chab mdo, in Tibet
- Namyi collection

=== Naga Videodisc ===
The Naga Videodisc is a multimedia resource created by Alan Macfarlane at Cambridge University in the late 1980s. It includes a large amount of ethnographic material about Naga communities. With the support of Sarah Harrison, the contents of the videodisc were converted into an online database that uses Bamboo as a retrieval system, with easily searchable XML files. Some film clips can be downloaded directly from the Digital Himalaya page, but the full collection can be seen on the Shanti Database at the University of Virginia.

=== Rare books and manuscripts ===
This collection offers digitized versions of multiple rare books and manuscripts that are in the public domain. The archive contains files in PDF format, and are free to download.

=== Thak Archive ===
This is a multimedia archive with photographs, films, census data, and economic and social data of the Gurung village of Thak in central western Nepal. These ethnographic records cover more than 30 years of work, and were collected by Alan Macfarlane and Sarah Harrison. The archive is regularly updated.

=== Thangmi Archive ===
This is an emerging collection of linguistic and cultural data relating to the Thangmi community of northeastern Nepal. These collections were deposited by Mark Turin and Sara Shneiderman, who have been working in partnership with Thangmi communities in Nepal and India since 1997. This archive gives users access to an online trilingual Thangmi - Nepali - English dictionary (in PDF format), recordings of Thangmi songs from the Reng Patangko collection, and film clips of Thangmi rituals, all available for streaming and download.

=== Williamson Collection ===
This collection contains films and photographs from Sikkim, Bhutan, and Tibet, in the 1930s. The films and photographs were taken by Frederick Williamson, a British Political Officer who documented his travels through the region with his wife, Margaret. The full collection is located at the Museum of Archaeology and Anthropology (MAA), at Cambridge.

=== Wutu Collection ===
This collection contains 18 short films from 1996 showing the Wutu ritual, an exorcism ritual performed by the Monguor (Tu) people of the Gnyan thog Village. The films were shot by Zhu Yonzhong, with editing by Gerald Roche. The collection is stored in an archive at the University of Cambridge.
