= Pratyoush Onta =

Nepali historian

- Education: PhD
- Alma mater: Brandeis University, B.A.; University of Pennsylvania, PhD
- Occupation: Historian
- Known for: Founding Editor of Studies in Nepali History and Society (started in 1996); Director, Martin Chautari, Martin Chautari

Pratyoush Onta is a Nepali historian and editor based at Martin Chautari. He is the author and editor/co-editor of several books including Social History of Radio Nepal (2004, in Nepali), Growing up with Radio (2005, in Nepali), 25 Years of Nepali Magazines (2013, in Nepali), The State of History Education and Research in Nepal (2014) and Political Change and Public Culture in Post-1990 Nepal (2017).

He received his BA (economics) in 1988 from Brandeis University and PhD in history from the University of Pennsylvania in 1996. He has written about the media in Nepal in the past and now mostly writes about higher education, research and knowledge distribution. He is a former Chair and current Director of Research, Martin Chautari, Kathmandu, Nepal. He is also the founding editor of the journals Studies in Nepali History and Society (SINHAS) published since 1996 by Mandala Book Point, Kathmandu and Media Adhyayan (established 2006; name changed to Samaj Adhyayan in 2016) published by Martin Chautari. He continues to edit both journals.

== Publications ==
=== Books ===
- 2004. Nepal Studies in the UK: Conversations with Practitioners. Kathmandu: Martin Chautari.
- 2006. Mass Media in Post-1990 Nepal. Kathmandu: Martin Chautari.
- 2014. The State of History Education and Research in Nepal. Kathmandu: Martin Chautari (co-written with Yogesh Raj)

=== Edited/Co-edited books ===
- 2017a. Political Change and Public Culture in Post-1990 Nepal, Michael J Hutt and Pratyoush Onta, eds., Delhi: Cambridge University Press.
- 2017b. Martin ChautariSamaj Adhyayan 12] (in Nepali). Kathmandu: Martin Chautari
- 2016. Samaj Adhyayan 11 (in Nepali). Kathmandu: Martin Chautari
- 2015. Media Adhyayan (Studies) 10, Devraj Humagai, Pratyoush Onta, Shekhar Parajuli, Harshman Maharjan and Arjun Panthi, eds., Kathmandu: Martin Chautari. (in Nepali)
- 2014. Media Adhyayan (Studies) 9. Devraj Humagai, Pratyoush Onta, Shekhar Parajuli, Harshman Maharjan and Arjun Panthi, eds., Kathmandu: Bhrikuti Academic Publications. (in Nepali)
- 2013a. Media Adhyayan (Studies) 8. Devraj Humagai, Pratyoush Onta, Shekhar Parajuli, Harshman Maharjan and Arjun Panthi, eds., Kathmandu: Martin Chautari. (in Nepali).
- 2013b. 25 Years of Nepali Magazines, Arjun Panthi, Pratyoush Onta and Harshman Maharjan, eds., Kathamdnu: Martin Chautari. (in Nepali)
- 2012a. Media Adhyayan (Studies) 7. Devraj Humagai, Pratyoush Onta, Arjun Panthi, Harshman Maharjan and Shekhar Parajuli, eds., Kathmandu: Martin Chautari. (in Nepali).
- 2012b, Autocratic Monarchy: Politics in Panchayat Nepal, Pratyoush Onta and Lokranjan Parajuli, eds., Kathmandu: Martin Chautari.
- 2011.Media Adhyayan (Studies) 6. Devraj Humagai, Shekhar Parajuli, Pratyoush Onta and Harshman Maharjan, eds., Kathmandu: Martin Chautari. (in Nepali).
- 2010.Media Adhyayan (Studies) 5. Devraj Humagai, Shekhar Parajuli and Pratyoush Onta, eds., Kathmandu: Martin Chautari. (in Nepali).
- 2009.Media Adhyayan (Studies) 4. Shekhar Parajuli, Pratyoush Onta and Devraj Humagai, eds., Kathmandu: Martin Chautari. (in Nepali).
- 2008a.Media Adhyayan (Studies) 3. Devraj Humagai, Pratyoush Onta, Shekhar Parajuli and Komal Bhatta, eds., Kathmandu: Martin Chautari. (in Nepali).
- 2008b.Socially Inclusive Media. Devraj Humagai, Pratyoush Onta, Shekhar Parajuli and Komal Bhatta, eds., Kathmandu: Martin Chautari. (in Nepali)
- 2008c. *Ten Years of Independent Radio: Development, Debates and the Public Interest, Devraj Humagai, Pratyoush Onta and Komal Bhatta, eds., Kathmandu: Martin Chautari. (in Nepali)
- 2007. Media Adhyayan (Studies) 2. Pratyoush Onta, Harshaman Maharjan, Devraj Humagai and Shekhar Parajuli, eds., Kathmandu: Martin Chautari. (in Nepali).
- 2006a. Media Adhyayan (Studies) 1. Devraj Humagai, Pratyoush Onta, Shekhar Parajuli, Komal Bhatta and Krishna Adhikari, eds., Kathmandu: Martin Chautari. (in Nepali).
- 2005a. Growing up with Radio: Listening Experiences of Three Generations of Nepalis, Shekhar Parajuli and Pratyoush Onta, eds., Kathmandu: Martin Chautari. (in Nepali).
- 2005b. Radio Journalism: News and Talk Programs in FM, Pratyoush Onta, Shekhar Parajuli, Devraj Humagai, Komal Bhatta and Krishna Adhikari, eds., Kathmandu: Martin Chautari. (in Nepali).
- 2004a. Social Scientific Thinking in the Context of Nepal. Mary Des Chene and Pratyoush Onta, eds., Lalitpur: Social Science Baha. (in Nepali).
- 2004b. The Social History of Radio Nepal, Pratyoush Onta, Shekhar Parajuli, Devraj Humagai, Krishna Adhikari and Komal Bhatta, eds., Kathmandu: Martin Chautari. (in Nepali).
- 2003a. Nepali Media Bibliography. Shekhar Parajuli, Pratyoush Onta, Krishna Adhikari, Komal Bhatta and Devraj Humagai, eds., Kathmandu: Martin Chautari and Centre for Social Research and Development. (in Nepali and English).
- 2003b. Analyses of Media: Some Social Contexts. Kathmandu: Martin Chautari and Centre for Social Research and Development. (in Nepali).
- 2003c. Media Production and Contents, Ramesh Parajuli and Pratyoush Onta, eds., Kathmandu: Martin Chautari and Centre for Social Research and Development. (in Nepali).
- 2002a. Regional Media: Its History and Present Status. Pratyoush Onta, eds., Kathmandu: Martin Chautari and Centre for Social Research and Development. (in Nepali).
- 2002b. Media Contents: Various Analyses. Pratyoush Onta, Ramesh Parajuli and Rama Parajuli, eds., Kathmandu: Centre for Social Research and Development. (in Nepali).
- 2002c. Local Radio: Potentiality and Utility. Kathmandu: Martin Chautari and Nepal Press Institute. (in Nepali).
- 2001a. Dalits and Janajatis in the Nepali Media, Pratyoush Onta and Shekhar Parajuli, eds., Kathmandu: Ekata Books. (in Nepali).
- 2001b.Dalits in Print, Pratyoush Onta, Pramod Bhatta, Bidhyanath Koirala, Khagendra Sangraula and CK Lal, eds., Kathmandu: Ekta Books. (in Nepali).
- 2001c. Janajatis in Print. Pratyoush Onta, Kumar Yatru, Bhaskar Gautam, Kathmandu: Ekta Books. (in Nepali).
- 1999. Women in Print: A Reference Reader. Kathmandu: Nepal Press Institute. (in Nepali).
