= Oral literature =

Spoken or sung literature

Oral literature, orature, or folk literature is a genre of literature that is spoken or sung in contrast to that which is written, though much oral literature has been transcribed. There is no standard definition, as anthropologists have used varying descriptions for oral literature or folk literature. A broad conceptualization refers to it as literature characterized by oral transmission and the absence of any fixed form. It includes the stories, legends, and history passed through generations in a spoken form.

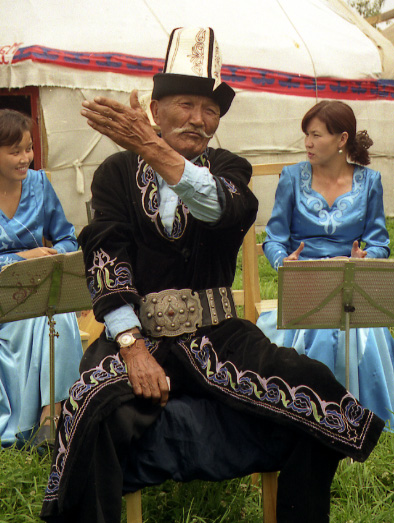
A traditional Kyrgyz manaschi performing part of the Epic of Manas at a yurt camp in Karakol, Kyrgyzstan

== Background ==
Pre-literate societies, by definition, have no written literature, but may possess rich and varied oral traditions—such as folk epics, folk narratives (including fairy tales and fables), folk drama, proverbs and folksongs—that effectively constitute an oral literature. Even when these are collected and published by scholars such as folklorists and paremiographers, the result is still often referred to as "oral literature". The different genres of oral literature pose classification challenges to scholars because of cultural dynamism in the modern digital age.

Literate societies may continue an oral tradition — particularly within the family (for example bedtime stories) or informal social structures. The telling of urban legends may be considered an example of oral literature, as can jokes and also oral poetry including slam poetry which has been a televised feature on Russell Simmons' Def Poetry; performance poetry is a genre of poetry that consciously shuns the written form. Furthermore, traditions demonstrating "persistent orality" can continue to thrive primarily through spoken or sung performance even within literate societies, adapting to new contexts and media. For example, Bhojpuri folk song traditions, carried by the Indian diaspora to places like Mauritius and Trinidad, demonstrate resilience and adaptation not primarily through print, but through continued performance in various settings (from weddings to public fêtes and carnivals) and circulation across multiple platforms, including commercial recordings, radio, film, and digital media like YouTube. This process often involves linguistic and musical creolisation (e.g., the development of Chutney music blending Bhojpuri elements with English lyrics and Caribbean rhythms) and the creation of what some scholars term "soft texts"—where familiar fragments, melodies, or evocative words maintain cultural resonance even as the original forms evolve.

Oral literatures forms a generally more fundamental component of culture, but operates in many ways as one might expect literature to do. The Ugandan scholar Pio Zirimu introduced the term orature in an attempt to avoid an oxymoron, but oral literature remains more common both in academic and popular writing. The Encyclopaedia of African Literature, edited by Simon Gikandi (Routledge, 2003), gives this definition: "Orature means something passed on through the spoken word, and because it is based on the spoken language it comes to life only in a living community. Where community life fades away, orality loses its function and dies. It needs people in a living social setting: it needs life itself."

In Songs and Politics in Eastern Africa, edited by Kimani Njogu and Hervé Maupeu (2007), it is stated (page 204) that Zirimu, who coined the term, defines orature as "the use of utterance as an aesthetic means of expression" (as quoted by Ngũgĩ wa Thiong'o, 1988). According to the book Defining New Idioms and Alternative Forms of Expression, edited by Eckhard Breitinger (Rodopi, 1996, page 78): "This means that any 'oral society' had to develop means to make the spoken word last, at least for a while. We tend to regard all the genres of orature as belonging to the homogeneous complex of folklore."

Building on Zirimu's orature concept, Mbube Nwi-Akeeri explained that Western theories cannot effectively capture and explain oral literature, particularly those indigenous to regions such as Africa. The reason is that there are elements to oral traditions in these places that cannot be captured by words alone, such as the existence of gestures, dance, and the interaction between the storyteller and the audience. According to Nwi-Akeeri, oral literature is not only a narrative, but also a performance.

== History of oral literature ==
Oral tradition is seen in societies with vigorous oral conveyance practices to be a general term inclusive of both oral literature and any written literature, including sophisticated writings, as well, potentially, as visual and performance arts which may interact with these forms, extend their expression, or offer additional expressive media. Thus even where no phrase in local language which exactly translates "oral literature" is used, what constitutes "oral literature" as understood today is already understood to be part or all of the lore media with which a society conducts profound and common cultural affairs among its members, orally. In this sense, oral lore is an ancient practice and concept natural to the earliest storied communications and transmissions of bodies of knowledge and culture in verbal form from the dawn of language-based human societies, and 'oral literature' thus understood was putatively recognized in times prior to recordings of history in non-oral media, including painting and writing.

Oral literature as a concept, after 19th-century antecedents, was more widely circulated by Hector Munro Chadwick and Nora Kershaw Chadwick in their comparative work on the "growth of literature" (1932–40). In 1960, Albert B. Lord published The Singer of Tales, which influentially examined fluidity in both ancient and later texts and "oral-formulaic" principles used during composition-in-performance, particularly by contemporary South Slavic bards relating long traditional narratives.

From the 1970s onwards, the term "Oral literature" appears in the work of both literary scholars and anthropologists: Finnegan (1970, 1977), Görög-Karady (1976), Bauman (1986), in the World Oral Literature Project and in the articles of the journal Cahiers de Littérature Orale.

== Deaf culture ==
Although deaf people communicate manually rather than orally, their culture and traditions are considered in the same category as oral literature. Stories, jokes and poetry are passed on from person to person with no written medium.

== See also ==
- Archive of Turkish Oral Narrative
- Ethnopoetics
- Guslar
- Hainteny
- Improvisation
- Intangible Cultural Heritage
- Kamishibai
- Korean art
- Masterpieces of the Oral and Intangible Heritage of Humanity
- National epic
- Oral poetry
- Oral history
- Oral Literature and Research Programme
- Oral tradition
- Oral-formulaic composition
- Orality
- Palestinian hikaye
- Pantun
- Patha
- Seanachai
- Yukar
- Storytelling
- World Oral Literature Project

== Bibliography ==
- Finnegan, Ruth (2012), Oral Literature in Africa. Cambridge: Open Book Publishers. CC BY edition doi:10.11647/OBP.0025
- Ong, Walter (1982), Orality and Literacy: the technologizing of the word. New York: Methuen Press.
- Tsaaior, James Tar (2010), "Webbed words, masked meanings: Proverbiality and narrative/discursive strategies" in D. T. Niane's Sundiata: an epic of old Mali. Proverbium 27: 319–338.
- Vansina, Jan (1978), "Oral Tradition, Oral History: Achievements and Perspectives", in B. Bernardi, C. Poni and A. Triulzi (eds), Fonti Orali, Oral Sources, Sources Orales. Milan: Franco Angeli, pp. 59–74.
- Vansina, Jan (1961), Oral Tradition. A Study in Historical Methodology. Chicago and London: Aldine and Routledge & Kegan Paul.
