= Earls Colne Grammar School =

Location
- Earls Colne, Essex; England; 51.9269°N 0.7009°E

Information
- Type: Grammar school
- Established: 1520
- Closed: 1975
- Local authority: Essex County Council

Earls Colne Grammar School was a grammar school in Earls Colne, Essex, England that was founded in 1520 and closed in 1975.

== History ==
=== Foundation ===
Earls Colne Grammar School was founded in 1520 when Christopher Swallow, vicar of Messing endowed land in trust to the Earl of Oxford, the income from which was to support a schoolmaster to teach Latin to thirty boys.

In 1673 the last Earl of Oxford sold the school estates to members of the Cressener family, who thereby became patrons of the school. Under a succession of clergymen-headmasters the school had achieved a high reputation by the mid 18th century, but the majority of pupils were the fee paying sons of local minor gentry. As a result, the patron decided to change the school from curriculum from a classical based one to one giving an elementary education in reading, writing and accounts which, he maintained, would be more useful to the local boys for whose benefit the school had been endowed.

This situation remained until the school was closed in 1837 after an investigation by the Charity Commission revealed evidence of mis-management. It re-opened in 1843 under a new scheme by which the estates were transferred to eleven trustees drawn from the local clergy and gentry. It was still called a Free Grammar School but fees of 6d a week were charged and the thirty pupils were given a clerks education up to the age of 14 only.

In 1868 the Taunton Commission, investigating endowed grammar schools, was in turn critical of the 1843 scheme. A site for a permanent building was bought in 1876 and plans to amalgamate several local educational charities and establish a central Colne Valley School in Halstead were defeated by local opposition. In 1883 the school was temporarily closed to allow funds to accumulate. A new scheme was drawn up to provide a grammar school education on modern and scientific lines and building began in 1892.

=== New buildings ===
In 1904 a master's house, boarding house, laboratories and other buildings had been added, towards the cost of which Reuben Hunt contributed more than £6,000. When Halstead Grammar School was converted to a girls' school its boys were transferred to Earls Colne bringing the numbers up to 90. By 1926 there were 135 boys on the roll but the numbers dropped alarmingly during the depression. A new policy adopted in 1935 whereby the school was to adopt an agricultural bias arrested the decline.

=== Voluntary control ===
By the Education Act 1944 the school chose Voluntary controlled status and the County development plan envisaged it as a school for 150 boys aged 11 to 18 with places for 30 boarders.

=== Closure ===
In fact numbers continued to grow as facilities and curriculum were extended and reached 230 by 1958. However the school was closed in July 1975 through the re-organisation of County schools on comprehensive lines, being merged with various other local schools into The Ramsey School (now The Ramsey Academy) in Halstead.

== Notable Schoolmasters ==
- Thomas Shepard (1627–35)
- Ralph Josselin 1650–1658
- Dave Wallis 1970–1975

== Notable Former Pupils ==
- Reuben Hunt
- Martyn King b.1937, professional footballer Colchester United from 1956 to 1968. Scorer of most league goals for the club. Total aggregate 130.
- Sir Ronald Long, President of the Law Society of England and Wales from 1963 to 1964
- Perring, Franklyn (18 October 2003). "Obituary: Franklyn Perring". The Independent. Archived from the original on 11 March 2007 – via FindArticles.
- Prof Richard Smith, Professor of Historical Geography and Demography at the University of Cambridge since 2003
- Roy Ullyett OBE, b.1914 d.2001, sports Cartoonist with the Daily Express and a founder member of the British Cartoonists' Association
