= South Asia Union Catalogue =

The South Asia Union Catalogue, a component of the Digital South Asia Library, is a bibliography of books and periodicals published in the Indian subcontinent from 1556 through the present. It is at present based on the holding of the Library of Congress and British Library, supplemented by records from the South Asia Microform Project at the Center for Research Libraries, the University of Chicago Library, the Roja Muthiah Research Library (RMRL), the Sundarayya Vignana Kendram, and other South Asian libraries. It is planned to include all known library holdings of the materials along with information about publications for which no holding library is known to create a definitive statement on publishing in the South Asian subcontinent.

The four phases of the project cover different geographic regions. Phase I covers south India and Sri Lanka, with most of the works in the Dravidian languages and Sinhala. Phase II covers eastern South Asia and colonial Burma, with the works being in Indo-Aryan, Tibeto-Burman, and Austroasiatic languages of the area. Phase III covers north central South Asia, including Nepal, with most of the material being in Nepali, Marathi, Gujarati, and Hindi. Phase IV covers western South Asia, including Afghanistan, Pakistan, and parts of northwestern India, with the corresponding Indo-Iranian and western Indo-Aryan languages, most of which are written in Perso-Arabic script.

The Southern Asia Department at the University of Chicago Library is the lead partner.
