= Ranahar =

2018 Nepali novel by Yogesh Raj

Ranahar (रणहार)
- Cover page
- Author: Yogesh Raj
- Original title: रणहार
- Language: Nepali
- Genre: Historical fiction
- Published: 2 June 2018
- Publisher: Nepa~laya Publication
- Publication place: Nepal
- Pages: 151
- Award: Madan Puraskar
- ISBN: 9937921244

Ranahar (Nepali: रणहार) is a 2018 Nepali historical fiction novel by Yogesh Raj. It was published on 2 June 2018 by Nepa~laya publications The book won the Madan Puraskar of that year. The book follows the life of Ranajit Malla, the last king of Bhaktapur and his defeat to Prithvi Narayan Shah. The name of the main character is Ranajit (one who triumphs in the war) whereas Ranahar means defeat in the war, so the title of the book is a wordplay on the name of the protagonist.

== Synopsis ==
The book journeys the life of the prince from his childhood to his defeat. The book shows the culture and society of that period. The construction of Nyatapola Temple by his father King Bhupatindra Malla is also a part of the story of the novel. The book also contains lots of words in Nepal Bhasa.

== Reception ==
The book won the prestigious Madan Puraskar for 2018 (2075 BS).

== See also ==
- Maharani
- Yogmaya
- Seto Dharti
