= Sundarayya Vignana Kendram =

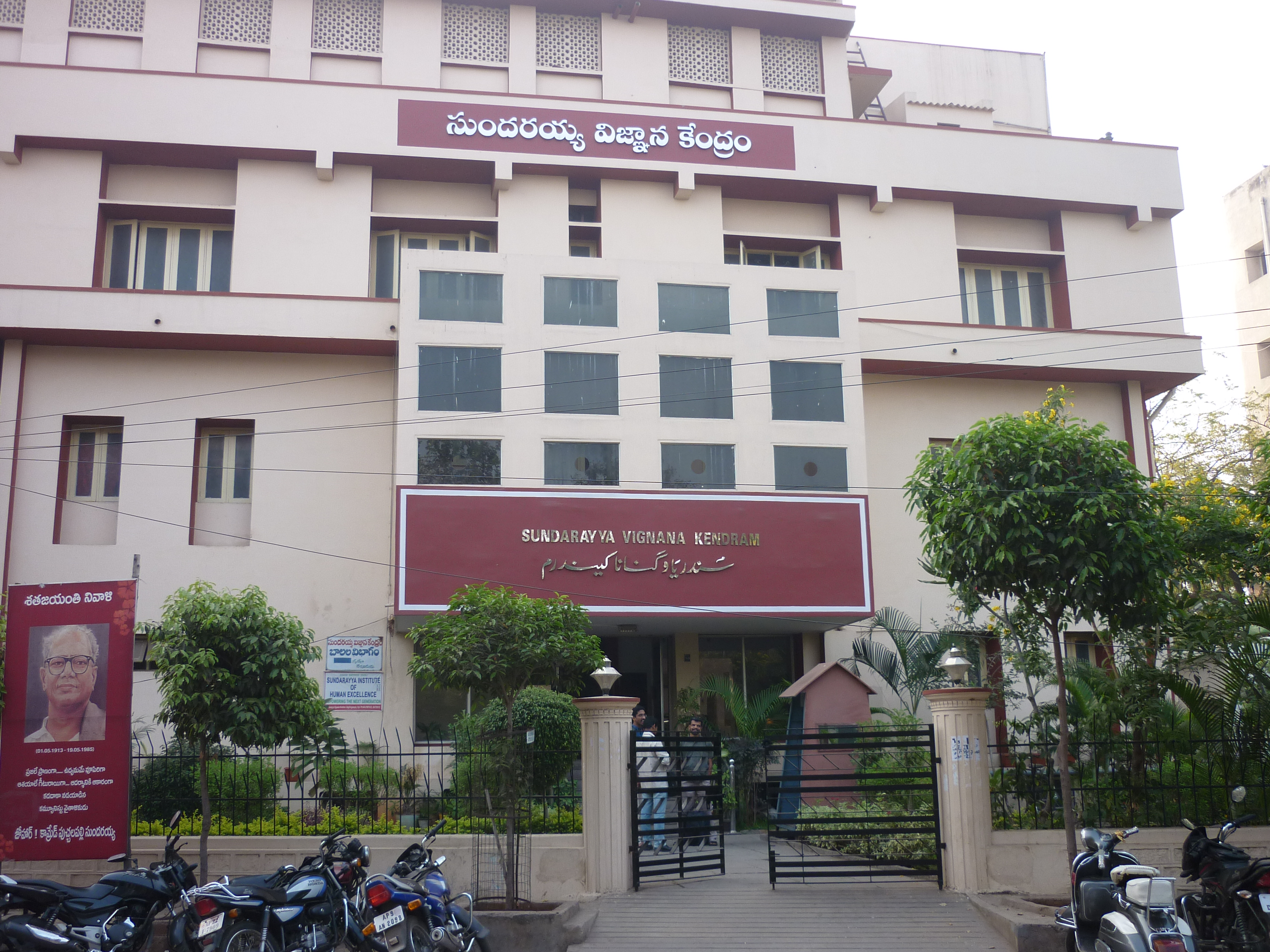
- Sundarayya Vignana Kendram
- 17.436189377098692°N 78.36084922611762°E
- Location: Telangana, India
- Established: 1985

Other information
- Website: www.sundarayya.org

Sundarayya Vignana Kendram is a famous Library in Hyderabad, founded by a Voluntary trust in memory of late Puchalapalli Sundaraiah in 1988. The primary objective of the Kendram is the conservation of the cultural heritage of Indian civilisation.

== Collection ==
The major part consists of Sundarayya's personal collection. The book donations of some literary giants and politicians, which include Dr. Aarudhra, Daasaradhi, Bezawada Gopala Reddy. The library houses more than 2,500,000 items of 19th and 20th century Telugu, Urdu and English literature. The Kendram is also purchasing the latest books and reports on a regular basis. The Urdu Research Center collection of Mr. Mohd. Abdus Samad Khan was purchased in 1996. The latter collection suffered major damage in August 2000 flooding.

The SVK is a partner in the Digital South Asia Library project, a global collaborative effort aimed at providing wider international access to rare historical resources. The SVK is one of three Indian institutions involved in this international venture, which includes some of the best universities in the world.
