= Edwin Manton =

English art collector (1909-2005)

Sir Edwin Alfred Grenville Manton (22 January 1909 – 1 October 2005) was an English art collector. He was a driving force in the creation of the American International Group (AIG), a collector of paintings by John Constable and his contemporaries, and a generous benefactor to the arts, the church and medicine.

Knighted in 1994 for charitable services to the Tate Gallery he was, after Sir Henry Tate, the most generous benefactor in its history and continued to involve himself in the affairs of the gallery well into his 90s.

== Early life ==
Sir Edwin was born in Earls Colne, Essex, 20 miles from Constable's birthplace. Shortly after his birth, the family moved to Westcliff-on-Sea on the Thames estuary, a location that gave him a lifelong affection for expanses of water and sky and which he much later recalled by acquiring paintings of the area by the English painter John Wonnacott.

However, during the first world war the family moved to Shaftesbury in Dorset. There he eventually enrolled at Shaftesbury Grammar School where he stayed on as a boarder, even after the family had moved to London.

== American International Group ==
In 1926, he declined a scholarship to Cambridge, instead following an uncle's introduction to the Paris agent of the Caledonian Insurance Company. In 1933, he was offered a post in New York. He joined as a casualty underwriter with the then small American International Underwriter Group, later the AIG, one of a number of companies established by Cornelius Vander Starr.

Soon afterwards, he married an American, Florence Brewer, known to all as Gretchen and they later had a daughter Diana. In 1939, he returned to London and volunteered for service, but was rejected on medical grounds having suffered from Stokes-Adams disease.

He became president of the American International Underwriters' Corporation in 1942. He served as president of AIU from 1942 to 1969. He took over the chairmanship of AIU in 1969, retiring officially in 1975. At his death, he was an honorary director of and senior advisor to AIG. During his most influential years, the company grew to a force of more than 50,000 people and Manton became a leading figure in the American insurance business.

His shareholding in AIG made him very wealthy and he was ranked as the 83rd richest person in the United Kingdom according to the Sunday Times Rich List 2003.

== Art Collecting ==
After the second world war, he began to collect British paintings. His particular enthusiasm was for Constable. During the 1960s and 1970s, he assembled one of the best collections in private hands, in spite of competition from Paul Mellon among others.

During this period, Constable scholars began to distinguish more rigorously between the works of John Constable, his son Lionel, and followers. In the early 1980s, Manton came to know Leslie Parris, deputy keeper of the British Collection at the Tate, who, together with Ian Fleming-Williams and Graham Reynolds, were the leading authorities in the field. Manton discovered many of the works in his collection were what he called Constabiles, rather than works by the master, but Manton took this to be part of the learning process and became close friends with Parris in particular.

== Philanthropy ==
His friendship with Parris resulted in the offer of a contribution to the Tate's 1987 appeal for funds to acquire Constable's Salisbury Cathedral from the Meadows, and shortly afterwards a gift of AIG shares, which established the American Fund for the Tate Gallery with an endowment of $6.5m in 1988.

Manton never took up US citizenship, retaining his British nationality until his death. In 1997, he established the American Fund for the Tate Gallery with an endowment generated by a gift of AIG shares. In creating a fund that would respond to the Tate's wish to strengthen its American collection, he was giving expression both to his affection for his birthplace and to his enthusiasm for his adopted country.

By 2005, the fund was worth $30m, and made possible the acquisition of major works by Robert Motherwell, Philip Guston, Donald Judd, David Smith, Louise Bourgeois, Ellsworth Kelly, Bruce Nauman and Cildo Meireles. Manton deliberately established the fund in a form that would allow American citizens to make donations which would support the mission of the Tate and this has stimulated very significant gifts of works of art and more than $70m in donations.

In 1992 and 1997, Manton made further gifts totalling nearly £12m towards the centenary development and other projects at Tate Britain; he also made a promised bequest of a major Constable, The Glebe Farm. These magnificent gifts allowed the trustees to transform the presentation of British art at Millbank as Tate Britain, in 2001. Taken together, Manton's benefactions, enhancing both the British and international collections, are by far the most generous gift in the history of the Tate.

Manton also was a longtime parishioner at the Episcopal Church of the Ascension in New York City. After his death, the Manton Foundation supported the construction of a new pipe organ in memory of Sir Edwin and Lady Manton. The 6,183-pipe, 95-stop Manton Memorial Organ was the first French-built pipe organ in New York City and was installed in 2011.
