= Jeremiah Shepard =

Jeremiah Shepard (August 11, 1648 – June 2, 1720) was an American Puritan minister and the youngest son of Margaret Shepard nee Borodell and Thomas Shepard, a major figure in the founding generation of Puritan New England. He was an early graduate of Harvard University, in the class of 1669. He married Mary Wainwright, a daughter of Francis and Philippa Wainwright, about 1672. Mary's brother Francis had also attended Harvard.

Shepard replaced his brother Samuel Shepard at the church in Rowley, Massachusetts and served at the church in Chebacco, later renamed Essex, Massachusetts, and at the church in Lynn, Massachusetts.

Like many ministers of his generation, Jeremiah Shepard encountered significant conflicts with his congregations. He was invited to give a monthly lecture at the church in Rowley, but after the election of several town Selectmen who opposed his appointment, the town government refused to pay his salary. Shepard later sued and a compromise was struck. Accepting a call to the church at Chebacco in 1678, Shepard encountered further opposition. The residents of Chebacco, who tired of the long trip to the church at Ipswich, Massachusetts attempted to withdraw from that church, but the members in Ipswich were unwilling that such a break be made. Shepard found himself caught in the middle and accepted a call at the church in Lynn in 1680, where he remained for 40 years.

The Journal of Obadiah Turner described Shepard thus:

"Ye new minister, Mr. Shepard, we find sound in doctrine and strong in speech; but wonderful grave and solemn, wch, after Mr. Whiting, seemeth like clouds after sunshine. Wee doubt not his pietie; but pieitie recommended by gloom cometh with but a poor recommend. However, he is mch of a stranger wth vs as yet. He dresseth in black clothes and weareth black gloves in ye pulpit, wch he must needes cut off at ye finger ends, ye wch is done to enable him to turne over ye book leaves."

Turner's Journal goes on to describe Shepard's conflicts with the church at Lynn when he attempted to remove all music from the service and replace it with more preaching.

Shepard was accused of wizardry during the excitement surrounding the Salem witch trials and was vehemently opposed to the governorship of Sir Edmund Andros.
