= Iris Macfarlane =

British writer

Iris Macfarlane (22 July 1922 – 12 February 2007) was a British writer.

Her memoir, Daughters of the Empire: A Memoir of Life and Times in the British Raj, covers her life as the wife of a wealthy tea planter in Assam in northeast British India. With her son, the noted anthropologist and historian Alan Macfarlane, she wrote The Empire of Tea (2004), a history of tea.

In 1976, Macfarlane published The Mouth of the Night, a collection of tales from the Popular Tales of the West Highlands translated from Gaelic. She also wrote on historical topics in History Today during the 1960s and 70s.
