= Mark Turin =

British linguist and anthropologist

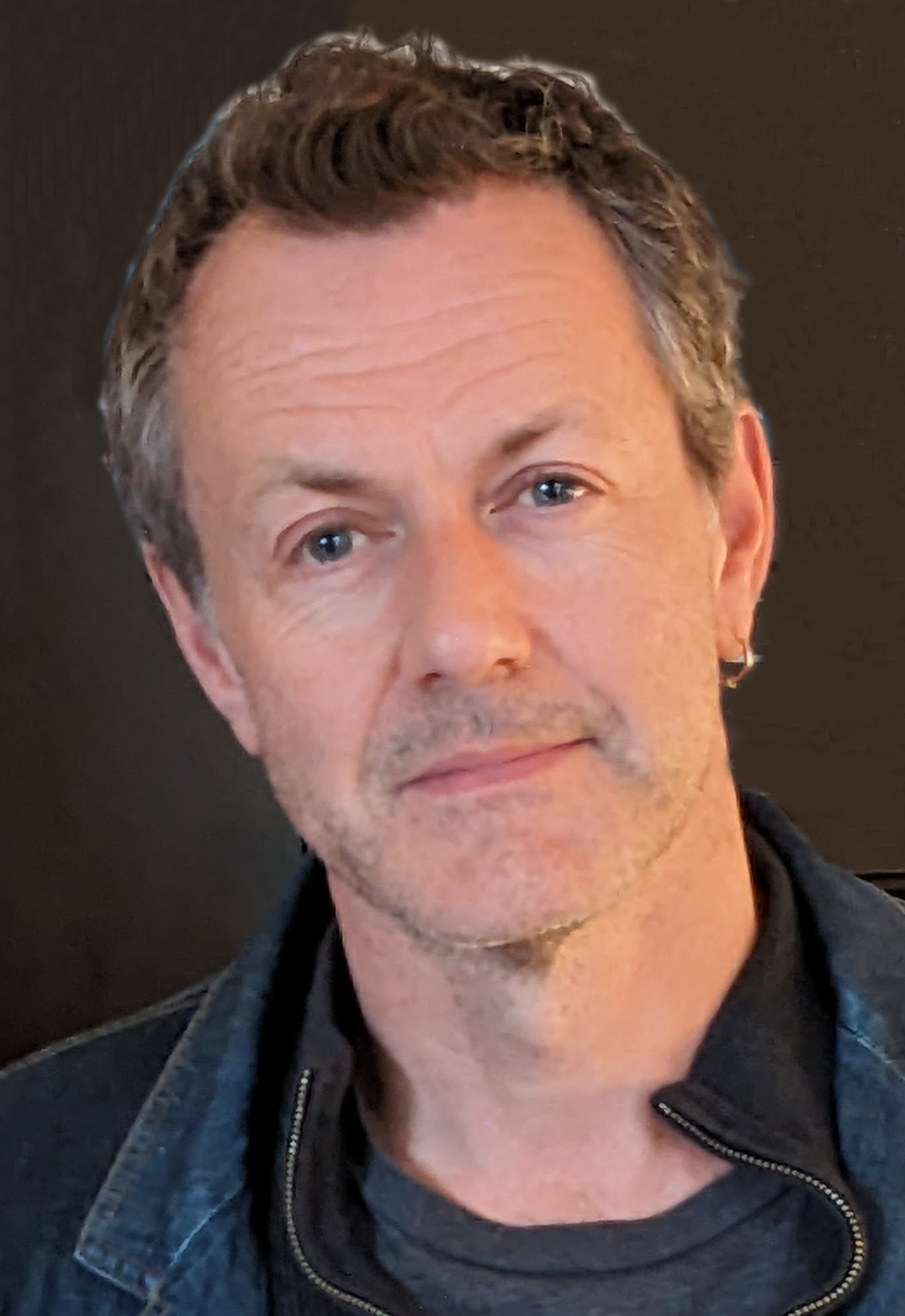
- Mark Turin, London, 2023
- Born: 27 October 1973 (age 52); London, United Kingdom
- Education: University of Cambridge, B.A. Leiden University, PhD
- Occupations: linguist, anthropologist, broadcaster
- Known for: Digital Himalaya, World Oral Literature Project, Yale Himalaya Initiative, Relational Lexicography, and presenting on BBC Radio
- Website: Official website

Mark Turin (born 1973) is a British anthropologist, linguist and occasional radio broadcaster who specialises in the Himalayas and the Pacific Northwest.

Turin was interim editor of the journal Pacific Affairs from 2023-2024. He is an associate professor at the University of British Columbia in the Institute for Critical Indigenous Studies.

== Early life and education ==
Turin was born into an Italian-Dutch family, and raised in the United Kingdom and briefly in New York. His Italian father, Duccio Turin, was a UN diplomat and chief architect of the Palestinian refugee camps. His Dutch mother, Hannah Oorthuys, is a graphic designer and therapist, and the daughter of the photographer Cas Oorthuys. Turin's half-brother is Luca Turin, a biophysicist and writer with a long-standing interest in bioelectronics, the sense of smell, perfumery, and the fragrance industry.

After attending University College School, and completing his undergraduate studies in Anthropology and Archaeology with First Class Honours from the University of Cambridge (1995), he completed his PhD at the University of Leiden, graduating in 2006.

== Career ==
Mark Turin is an associate professor at the University of British Columbia. His work is centered on Indigenous language endangerment, reclamation, and revitalization.

=== Linguistics and Anthropology ===
For his doctoral research at the University of Leiden through the Himalayan Languages Project, Turin worked collaboratively with the Indigenous Thangmi (Thami) speaking community in Nepal and Northern India to create a grammatical description and lexicon of the previously undocumented language. This work resulted in a Nepali-Thami-English dictionary published in 2004 and a grammar of the Thangmi language published in 2012. Turin's interest in Himalayan culture and language took him to Bhutan, where he was one of three principal investigators on a five-year collaborative project to record and preserve the endangered oral traditions of the nation. He has also conducted research in the Tibetan Autonomous Region of China and in the Indian state of Sikkim. Since 2015, Turin has worked in collaborative partnership with the Heiltsuk First Nation through a Language Mobilization Partnership, of which the University of British Columbia is a member.

=== Policy and Practice ===
In 2007, Turin established and directed the Translation and Interpretation Unit in the United Nations Mission in Nepal (UNMIN), a special political mission mandated by the UN Security Council to support Nepal's peace process. Turin has occasionally worked as a consultant for the World Bank and the International Centre for Integrated Mountain Development (ICIMOD).

=== Collaborative Research and Digital Humanities ===
Turin has been involved in many long term research projects and initiatives. In 2000, he co-founded the Digital Himalaya Project as a platform for multimedia resources from the Himalayan region. Turin directs the World Oral Literature Project which he established at the University of Cambridge in 2009. Since 2019, Turin has served as the principal investigator for the Relational Lexicography Project, a framework and toolkit for collaborative, community-informed dictionary work with marginalized languages. Turin is one of the project leads on a free interactive digital map of the languages of New York City, one of the most linguistically diverse metropolitan areas in the world.

From 2013 to 2017, together with Sienna Craig, Turin served as editor of Himalaya, the Journal of the Association for Nepal and Himalayan Studies. Turin's BBC Radio 4 series, Our Language in Your Hands, aired in December 2012, and his second series, On Language Location, on the linguistic landscape of Bhutan and Burma/Myanmar aired in October 2014 on BBC Radio 4 and in March 2015 on the BBC World Service. Turin is founding editor of the World Oral Literature Series with the Cambridge-based Open Book Publishers, which aims to preserve and promote the oral literatures of Indigenous communities in innovative, responsive, ethical and culturally-appropriate ways.

== Awards and accolades ==
- 2023: Dean of Arts Mentorship Award from the University of British Columbia
- 2021: Open Scholarship Award, Honourable Mention for the Digital Himalaya Project from the Canadian Social Knowledge Institute
- 2020: Open Education Resource Champion / Leader in Open Learning from the University of British Columbia
- 2019–2020: Wall Scholar Award at the Peter Wall Institute for Advanced Studies, University of British Columbia
- 2018–2019: Killam Faculty Research Fellowship, University of British Columbia
- 2014–2016: Green College Leading Scholar at the University of British Columbia
- 2013: Yvonne and Jack McCredie Fellowship in Instructional Technology for excellence and innovation in undergraduate teaching from Yale University
- 2009: Associate Award for Anthropology from the United Kingdom Higher Education Academy

== Publications ==
=== Books ===
- Bendi Tso; Marnyi Gyatso; Naljor Tsering; Turin, Mark; and Members of the Choné Tibetan Community (2023). Shépa: The Tibetan Oral Tradition in Choné. Cambridge: Open Book Publishers. ISBN 978-1-80064-801-2.
- Turin, Mark (2012). A Grammar of Thangmi with an Ethnolinguistic Introduction to the Speakers and their Culture. Brill's Tibetan Studies Library, Languages of the Greater Himalayan Region. Vol. 6. Leiden: Brill. ISBN 978-90-04-15526-8.
- Evans, Christopher; Pettigrew, Judith; Kromchain Tamu, Yarjung; Turin, Mark (2009). Grounding Knowledge/Walking Land: Archaeological Research and Ethno-historical Identity in Central Nepal. Cambridge: McDonald Institute for Archaeological Research. ISBN 978-1-902937-50-2. Archived from the original on 2 October 2012.
- Turin, Mark (2007). Linguistic Diversity and the Preservation of Endangered Languages: A Case Study from Nepal. Talking Points. ISBN 978-92-9115-055-7. Archived from the original on 26 July 2011.
- Turin, Mark; Thami, Bir Bahadur (2004). Nepali – Thami – English Dictionary. Kathmandu: Martin Chautari. ISBN 99933-812-4-1. Archived from the original on 21 February 2014.

=== Edited volumes ===
- 2023. Christine Schreyer; Mark Turin, eds. (2023). "Dictionaries: Journal of the Dictionary Society of North America: Special Issue on Indigenous Lexicography".
- 2019. The Politics of Language Contact in the Himalaya. Edited by Selma K. Sonntag and Mark Turin. Cambridge, UK: Open Book Publishers. doi:10.11647/OBP.0169
- 2019. Book 2.0: Year of Indigenous Languages. 9 (1 & 2). Edited by Mark Turin & Mick Gowar.
- 2018. Memory. Edited by Philippe Tortell, Mark Turin and Margot Young. Vancouver, Canada: Peter Wall Institute and UBC Press.
- 2017. Searching For Sharing: Heritage and Multimedia in Africa. Edited by Daniela Merolla and Mark Turin. Cambridge, UK: Open Book Publishers. doi:10.11647/OBP.0111
- 2014. Book 2.0: Digital Humanities. 4 (1 & 2). Edited by Mark Turin & Mick Gowar.
- 2014. Niko Thangmi Kham : Kaksha Nis (Our Thangmi Language : Class Two). Bir Bahadur Thami and Laxmi Basukala, edited by Mark Turin. Kathmandu: Educate the Children. Mother tongue primer for Thangmi-speaking children.
- 2014. Perspectives on Social Inclusion and Exclusion in Nepal, edited by Om Gurung, Mukta Singh Tamang and Mark Turin. Kathmandu: Central Department of Sociology / Anthropology, Tribhuvan University. ISBN 9789937524506.
- 2013. After the Return: Special Issue of Museum Anthropology Review, 7 (1–2). Edited by Joshua Bell, Kimberly Christen and Mark Turin.
- 2013. Oral Literature in the Digital Age: Archiving Orality and Connecting with Communities, edited by Mark Turin, Claire Wheeler and Eleanor Wilkinson. Cambridge: Oral Literature Series, Open Book Publishers. 190 pages. ISBN 9781909254305 & 9781909254312.
- 2011. Himalayan Languages and Linguistics: Studies in Phonology, Semantics, Morphology and Syntax, edited by Mark Turin and Bettina Zeisler. Brill's Tibetan Studies Library, 5. 323 pages. Brill: Leiden. ISBN 9789004194489 & 900419448 7.
- 2010. Language Documentation and Description, Volume 8, Special issue: Oral Literature and Language Endangerment, edited by Mark Turin and Imogen Gunn. London: Hans Rausing Endangered Languages Project, Department of Linguistics, School of Oriental and African Studies. 175 pages. ISSN 1740-6234.
- 2008. Gaiko Thangmi Kham : Kaksha Di (My Thangmi Language : Class One). Bir Bahadur Thami and Laxmi Basukala, edited by Mark Turin. Kathmandu: Educate the Children. Mother tongue primer for Thangmi-speaking children.
- 2004. Kesar Lall: A Homage on the Occasion of his Buraa Janko. Edited by Corneille Jest, Tej Ratna Kansakar and Mark Turin. Kathmandu: Marina Paper. ISBN 9993389072.
- 2003. Themes in Himalayan Languages and Linguistics . Edited by Tej Ratna Kansakar and Mark Turin. Kathmandu: South Asia Institute (SAI) Heidelberg and Tribhuvan University. ISBN 9993354163.

=== Media ===
- BBC Radio 4: On Language Location (October 2014)
  - Part 1: Bhutan
  - Part 2: Myanmar
- BBC Radio 4: Our Language in Your Hands (December, 2012)
  - Part 1: Nepal
  - Part 2: South Africa
  - Part 3: New York City
- 50 langues autochtones sur Google Earth – Radio-Canada Colombie-Britannique
- BBC World TV interview (June 2013) Endangered Languages
- Vanishing Voices
