= Thomas Shepard (minister) =

American minister in New England

Thomas Shepard (5 November 1605 – 25 August 1649) was an English, afterwards American Puritan minister and a significant figure in early colonial New England.

== Life ==
Shepard was born in Towcester, Northamptonshire. His devout mother died when he was four and he lived a difficult life under his stepmother. His father died when he reached ten, at which point he lived with his grandparents and later an older brother, whom he held in high and grateful regard. A schoolmaster ignited in him a scholarly interest, which ultimately led to entry into Emmanuel College in Cambridge University at the age of fifteen. He accounts in his autobiography that he lived a dissatisfied and dissolute life, which led him to pray out in a nearby field, at which point he underwent the beginnings of a conversion experience.

In 1627 he became assistant schoolmaster at Earls Colne Grammar School in Earls Colne, Essex. He became a minister whose sermons and Puritan ways drew the ire of Church of England Archbishop William Laud, and he was forbidden to preach. Following the death of his elder son, he left England in 1635 with his wife and younger son on a difficult voyage on the ship Defence for Massachusetts in colonial America where he became minister of one of the leading churches in the colonies, the first church in Cambridge, Massachusetts and also of Harvard University, then a very new school charged with training men for the Christian ministry in the Puritan colonies of New England. From 1637 to 1638, during the Antinomian Controversy, he sat with the other colonial ministers during both the civil and church trials of Anne Hutchinson, and was a very vocal critic of hers during the latter. His wife died shortly after his arrival in New England, as did his second wife and other children, though he framed these experiences, if not without difficulty, into the perspective of his theology.

Along with John Allin and John Eliot, he was involved in preaching to the native peoples on New England.

Shepard died of quinsy, a Peritonsillar abscess, which is a complication of tonsillitis at the age of 44.

== Legacy ==
Shepard was regarded as one of the foremost Puritan ministers of his day, esteemed in the company of individuals like Richard Mather and John Cotton. He took special interest in Puritan ministry to the Massachusetts Native Americans. His written legacy includes an autobiography and numerous sermons, which in some measure of contrast with others of his day, tended to accent God as an accessible and welcoming figure in the individual life. Today a plaque at Harvard University, in the words of Cotton Mather, records that it was in consideration of the salutary effect of Shepard's ministry that the college ultimately came to be placed in "Newtowne", known today as Cambridge, Massachusetts.

While Thomas Shepard ministered nearly a century and a half before the Congregational/Unitarian split in 1829, both First Parish in Cambridge and First Church in Cambridge Congregational consider him to be their founding minister.

Three of Shepard's sons followed him into the ministry; Thomas Shepard II, Samuel Shepard, and Jeremiah Shepard. Thomas Shepard II was an ancestor of U.S. Presidents John Quincy Adams and Franklin D. Roosevelt.

== Sources ==
- The History of Cambridge

== Works ==
- The Church Membership of Children, and Their Right to Baptism. Early American imprints. First series no. 19985. Cambridge. p. 39. Archived from the original on 2011-10-19.
- The Sincere Convert & the Sound Believer (Volume 1 of The Works). Soli Deo Gloria. 1999. p. 543. ISBN 1-877611-32-8. Archived from the original on 2011-10-06.
- The Parable of the Ten Virgins (Volume 2 of The Works). Soli Deo Gloria. 1990. p. 635. ISBN 1-877611-16-6. Archived from the original on 2011-10-06.
- Theses Sabbaticæ (Volume 3 of The Works). Soli Deo Gloria. 1992. p. 540. ISBN 1-877611-41-7.
- A Treatise of Liturgies, Power of the Keyes, and of Matter of the Visible Church. Full text at Umich/eebo. (open)
