= Yogesh Raj =

Nepalese historian and writer

- योगेश राज
- Education: PhD
- Alma mater: Imperial College, London
- Occupations: Historian, academic
- Notable work: Ranahar
- Awards: Madan Puraskar

Yogesh Raj is a Nepali historian, scholar and writer. He won the Madan Puraskar for his novel Ranahar in 2018.

== Biography ==
He has a degree in mechanical engineering and a PhD in the history of science, technology, and medicine from Imperial College, London. He is a polyglot and speaks seven languages (Maithali, Nepali, English, Hindi, Bengali, Nepalbhasa and German).

In 2013, he wrote a book based on the death rituals of Hindu Newars titled Sandhya Samrachana: Hindu Newarharu ko Mrityu Chetana. He edited the jail diaries of the martyr Bharat Gopal Jha which was published as Uhi Jha: Euta Yuba Sahidko Antim Jail Diary (2018–2020) in 2017.

He published his first novel Ranahar in 2018. The novel is about the last king of Bhaktapur kingdom, Ranajit Malla. It won the Madan Puraskar for the same year.

== Notable works ==
Books
Title	Year of publication	Genre	Language	Notes
History as Mindscapes: A Memory of the Peasants' Movement of Nepal	2010	Non-fiction	English	
The Journal of Captain Kinloch	2012	Non-fiction	English	
Expedition to Nepal Valley: The Journal of Captain Kinloch (26 August – 17 October 1767)	2012	Non-fiction	English	
Sandhya Samrachana: Hindu Newarharu ko Mrityu Chetana	2013	Anthropological	Nepali	
The State of History Education and Research in Nepal	2014	Non-fiction	English	Cowritten with Pratyoush Raj Onta
Courage in Chaos: Early Rescue and Relief After the April Earthquake	2015	Non-fiction	English	Cowriten with Bhaskar Gautam
Ranahar	2018	Historical fiction	Nepali	Winner – Madan Puraskar

Edited

- Ruptures and repairs in South Asia: historical perspectives (2013, Non-fiction, English)
- Uhi Jha: Euta Yuba Sahidko Antim Jail Diary (2018–2020) (Written by Bharat Gopal Jha, published 2017, Nepali)

== See also ==
- Chandra Prakash Baniya
- Pratyoush Onta
