= Gerhard Kubik =

Austrian music ethnologist (born 1934)

Gerhard Kubik (born 10 December 1934) is an Austrian music ethnologist from Vienna. He studied ethnology, musicology and African languages at the University of Vienna. He published his doctoral dissertation in 1971 and achieved habilitation in 1980.

== Biography ==
Kubik has been carrying out research in Africa for every year since 1958. Since then, he has published over 300 articles and books on Africa and African Americans, based on his field work in fifteen African countries, in Venezuela and Brazil.

In 1975 he visited Malawi and took Moya Aliya Malamusi back with him. Malamusi had to learn German but he later obtained his own doctorate and began teaching at the University of Vienna.Kubik is a regular visitor of the Malamusi's Oral Literature Research Programme in Malawi. Kubik's topics are music and dance, oral traditions and traditional systems of education, the extension of African culture to the Americas (especially Brazil) and the linguistics of the Bantu languages of central Africa. Moreover, Kubik has compiled the largest collection of African traditional music worldwide, with over 25,000 recordings, mostly archived at the Phonogrammarchiv Wien in Vienna.

Kubik also performs as a clarinettist with a neo-traditional kwela Jazz Band from Malawi that has been performing throughout Europe and Brazil.
