= Security Attribute Modulation Protocol =

Security Attribute Modulation Protocol (SAMP) is a protocol used to encode role-based and user-based access control attributes for transmission over a network, typically embedded in a TCP/IP or UDP/IP packet, with an application layer payload trailing afterwards. It is a component of the Department of Defense Intelligence Information System Network Security for Information Exchange (DNSIX) specification version 2.1.

Sun Microsystems makes a brief mention of SAMP in their Trusted Solaris 8 administration manuals. In the case of Trusted Solaris 8, the Trusted Network Daemon parses SAMP headers and manages system security in conjunction with other security provisions on the system. It does not use the same technical specification as DNSIX 2.1, it uses the TSOL protocol (a derivative of TSIX(RE) 1.1).
