= Samp (surname) =

Samp is a surname. Notable people with the surname include:

- Edward J. Samp, American football coach
- Jerzy Samp (1951–2015), Polish writer, publicist, and historian
- Wawrzyniec Samp (born 1939), Polish sculptor and graphic artist
