= World Oral Literature Project =

Global initiative

World Oral Literature Project logo.

The World Oral Literature Project was "an urgent global initiative to document and disseminate endangered oral literatures before they disappear without record". Directed by Dr Mark Turin and co-located at the Museum of Archaeology and Anthropology, at the University of Cambridge and Yale University, the project was established in January 2009.

From March 2013 the organization ceased funding projects, whilst maintaining online resources.

== Objective ==
The World Oral Literature Project provided small grants to fund the collecting of oral literature, with a particular focus on the peoples of Asia and the Pacific, and on areas of cultural disturbance. In addition, the Project hosted training workshops for grant recipients and other engaged scholars. The World Oral Literature Project also publishes oral texts and occasional papers, and makes collections of oral traditions accessible through online media platforms such as Cambridge Streaming Media Service and DSpace.

== Activities ==
=== Research ===
Fourteen funded oral literature fieldwork and documentation projects were completed between 2009-2013.

=== Online collections ===
The World Oral Literature Project collected data gathered by grantees and anthropology fieldworkers as well as historic collections. This data is primarily audio and visual files that are either born digital or are digitised by the Project. This material is archived using DSpace and, where culturally appropriate, disseminated to the public through the World Oral Literature Project websites and streaming media services.

=== Occasional Paper series ===
Papers published by the World Oral Literature Project and Open Book Publishers:

- Pax, Stephen (2010), Faroese skjaldur: An endangered oral tradition of the North Atlantic
- Appell, George N. (2010), The Sabah Oral Literature Project
- Wickett, Elizabeth (2010), The Epic of Pabuji ki par in Performance
- Kaschula, Russell; Mostert, Andre (2011), From Oral Literature to Technauriture: What's in a Name?
- Moseley, Christopher (2012), The UNESCO Atlas of the World's Languages in Danger: Context and Process
- Baumgart, Ursula; Lorin, Marie (2013), Encyclopaedia of Literatures in African Languages

=== Database ===
Researchers at the World Oral Literature Project have compiled a database of language endangerment levels, including references to collections and recordings of oral literature that exist in archives around the world. Data on language endangerment are drawn from the online Ethnologue, the UNESCO Atlas of the World’s Languages in Danger, and from a 'red list' compiled by Professor William Sutherland in the Department of Zoology at the University of Cambridge.

However the project states The World Oral Literature Project does not take responsibility for the accuracy of the materials that our researchers have compiled from these three sources, and the Project does not have the staffing capacity to keep these resources up to date..

== See also ==
- Oral literature
- Oral tradition
- Orality
- Linguistic anthropology
- Anthropological linguistics
