= The Ramsey Academy =

Location
- Colne Road; Halstead, Essex, CO9 2HR; England; 51°56′50″N 0°38′46″E

Information
- Type: Academy
- Motto: "Achieve Excellence Together"
- Established: 1975
- Department for Education URN: 139248 Tables
- Ofsted: Reports
- Executive Headteacher: Julia Mead
- Gender: Coeducational
- Age: 11 to 16
- Enrolment: 723
- Colours: Burgundy and Black
- Website: www.ramseyacademy.com

The Ramsey Academy is a coeducational secondary school with academy status, located in Halstead, Essex, England.

== History ==
In 1975 three local schools, including Earls Colne Grammar School, Halstead Grammar School and Halstead Secondary School, amalgamated into the Ramsey School, as part of the re-organisation of schooling along comprehensive lines. The school was named after Dame Mary Ramsey, a 16th-century local educational philanthropist.

The 2006 Ofsted report averaged the college at a satisfactory grade. However this was revoked by the Ofsted report in 2012, when the school was placed under special measures. The school converted to academy status in September 2013 and was renamed The Ramsey Academy.

In 2023 the school was found to have four potentially structurally unsound classrooms due to the use of reinforced autoclaved aerated concrete as a building material.

== Notable former pupils ==
- Steve Lamacq, BBC Radio DJ
