= Ralph Josselin =

Ralph Josselin (26 January 1616 – August 1683) (Note: By contemporary reckoning, Josselin was born on 26 January 1616. However, at the time of his birth the Julian calendar was still in use in England and the year began on 25 March rather than 1 January. By our modern reckoning (after adjustment to the Gregorian calendar and 1 January as the start of the year), his date of birth can also be expressed as 5 February 1617 N.S. (see Old Style and New Style dates).) was the vicar of Earls Colne in Essex from 1640 until his death in 1683. His diary records intimate details of everyday farming life, family and kinship in a small, isolated rural community, and is often studied by researchers interested in the period, alongside other similar diaries like that of Samuel Pepys.

== Offers ==
Josselin had previously (and briefly) been incumbent of Cranham, Essex. Like many clergy, Josselin also taught a school (at Upminster). It appears Josselin did not enjoy good health at Cranham, and the rectory was, in any case, eventually restored to its previous, sequestered incumbent. He was also offered a more lucrative position at Hornchurch, presumably by New College, Oxford (whose perpetual curate holds that living). Josselin had relatives living at Cranham, whom he visited occasionally, long after the move to Earl's Colne.

== Diary ==
An edited version of the diary first became available in the early 20th century. A full, edited transcript of the diary's 290,000 words was published in 1975. The text of this is available online and appeared in paperback in 1991.

Alan Macfarlane began collecting information relating to Earls Colne and the diary, while working on his doctorate at the Essex Record Office in the 1960s. From it he and Sarah Harrison attempted to "reconstruct" a historical community. In 1970, Macfarlane also published an anthropological study of Josselin's family life.
