= Oral Literature and Research Programme =

Malawian research institute and museum

- Founder: Dr Moya Malamusi
- Established: 1989
- Address: P.O. Box 75, Chileka
- Location: Chileka, Blantyre, Malawi, Blantyre, Malawi

The Oral Literature Research Programme is an independent research institution founded in 1989 by Malawian cultural anthropologist Moya Aliya Malamusi, and his sister, the late Lidiya Malamusi. It is based in Chileka, Blantyre, Malawi, about a kilometre from the Chileka International Airport. Moya Aliya Malamusi (born in 1959) is an ethnomusicologist and lecturer at the University of Vienna and Sigmund Freud University (SFU, Vienna). Malamusi has researched guitar styles and techniques in southern Africa. He has also published a selection of his field recordings Lake Malawi to the Zambezi (Frankfurt, 1999)and the Endangered traditions—Endangered Creativity (Frankfurt 2011).

Its objective is the recording and documentation of orally transmitted African cultural traditions, notably oral literature (storytelling, riddling, proverbs, sayings etc.), song/dance, musical instruments, local technologies, ritual events such as in the nyau secret society, or in chinamwali initiation. The centre is housed in a large private compound owned by Moya A. Malamusi and his wife and includes archival collections and a special building called the Jacaranda House which serves as a Museum of Ethnographic Objects open to visitors from schools and the public.

The permanent members of the Oral Literature Research Programme include Maliya Moya, a writer and oral literature researcher, Dyna Malamusi who has a journalism background, and the musician-composers Sinosi Mlendo and Christopher Gerald. External researchers, cooperating with the centre include Kayombo kaChinyeka and Moses Yotamu from Zambia, Albert Bisaso from Uganda, and Vera Mwinuka from Tanzania. The internationally renowned cultural anthropologist Gerhard Kubik is also associated with the center and spends long periods of study at the institution every year.

Dr. Malamusi's research group is in contact with other institutions across East and southern Africa including the Department of Fine and Performing Arts of the University Of Dar es Salaam in Tanzania through Dr. Mitchel Strumpf, and the International Library of African Music at Rhodes University, South Africa.

Over a period of 21 years they have built up a vast collection of recordings on audio and video tape, estimated to amount about 4,500 individual items. These include story-telling (nthano)in context, rare musical instruments, and historical performances.

The Museum of Ethnographic Objects houses rare musical instruments, now extinct, and also work utensils. It also houses the estate of Donald Kachamba, musician-composer. He died in 2001.
