= South Asian Microform Project =

The South Asian Microform Project, also known by South Asian Materials Project and SAMP is one of six programs headed by the Center for Research Libraries (CRL) Global network. SAMP preserves higher education material via microform, among other techniques.

== Overview ==
SAMP is affiliated with the Association for Asian Studies. In 2019 SAMP partnered with JSTOR providing over 500,000 digitized pages freely available as of March 2020.

== History ==
Early foundations of SAMP began in 1962 by academic scholars and librarians who felt the need to preserve physical material. These individuals formed the Inter-University Committee on South Asian Scholarly Resources at the University of Chicago, led by chairman Robert E. Frykenberg of the University of Wisconsin History Department. These individuals wanted to coordinate the filming and bibliographic control of these materials. Other earlier objects of SAMP included:

- promote cooperative acquisition efforts;
- begin a bibliographic survey of existing South Asian microfilm resources in the U.S.
- maintain a master file and information clearinghouse for these resources;
- assist scholars and librarians in locating filmed materials;
- acquire a portable microfilm unit to be found in India to be used on a rental basis by U.S. scholars; and
- publish a newsletter dealing with microfilm resources

CRL officially founded SAMP in 1967, focusing on materials from India, Pakistan, Bangladesh, Nepal, and Sri Lanka. They primarily specialized in collecting documents that were difficult to achieve, expensive, or of limited quantities. By the end of their first year, SAMP had gathered a total of thirteen items.

== Members ==
CRL memberships are not required to take part in SAMP. Any institution or nonprofit organization that maintains a library can participate. Members are granted full access to the materials provided by the SAMP. The following is the current list of university members of the SAMP:

- University of British Columbia
- University of California, Berkeley
- University of California, Los Angeles
- Centre for Studies in Social Sciences, Calcutta
- University of Chicago
- Columbia University
- Cornell University
- Duke University
- Emory University
- Harvard University
- University of Hawaii at Manoa
- University of Illinois at Urbana-Champaign
- Indiana University
- University of Iowa
- Kansas State University
- Library of Congress
- Madan Puraskar Pustakalaya
- Michigan State University
- University of Michigan
- University of Minnesota-Twin Cities
- University of Missouri-Columbia
- Mushfiq Khwaja Library and Research Centre
- New York Public Library
- New York University
- North Carolina State University
- University of North Carolina at Chapel Hill
- University of Notre Dame
- Ohio State University
- University of Pennsylvania
- Princeton University
- Roja Muthiah Research Library
- Rutgers University
- Stanford University
- Syracuse University
- University of Texas at Austin
- University of Toronto
- University of Virginia
- Washington University
- University of Washington
- University of Wisconsin-Madison
- Yale University
