= Roja Muthiah Research Library =

Research library in Chennai, India

Roja Muthiah Research Library (RMRL)
- Type: Research Library
- Established: 1994
- Director: G. Sundar
- Location: 3rd Cross Road; Central Polytechnic Campus; Taramani; Chennai 600113, Chennai, Tamil Nadu, India; 12.997841°N 80.248464°E
- Campus: Urban
- Website: http://www.rmrl.in

The Roja Muthiah Research Library (RMRL), in Chennai, India, was founded in 1994, and opened to researchers in 1996; it provides research materials for Tamil studies in a variety of fields of the humanities, social sciences, and sciences. The Library is based on the collection of Roja Muthiah, who accumulated one of the world's finest private libraries of Tamil publications.

== Roja Muthiah and RMRL ==
Roja Muthiah Research Library (RMRL) is a resource and research hub for south Indian studies covering diverse fields from humanities, social sciences to popular culture. The RMRL holds a unique collection and is widely recognized as a model library in India. With beginnings as a small private collection by Roja Muthiah, the library now holds an impressive 3,00,000 items and aims at continually preserving and expanding the historic archive.

The RMRL is what it is today thanks to the pioneering efforts of Roja Muthiah Chettiar from Kottaiyur. Muthiah began his career as a sign-board artist and soon became enthralled by antiquarian books. and started collecting classical Tamil literature in 1950. At the time of his death in 1992, the collection comprised nearly 1,00,000 items in Tamil which included books, periodicals and several other literary gems. Understanding the significance of the library and the need to preserve its valuable contents the University of Chicago bought the entire collection in 1994. However, with the library being deeply rooted in south Indian culture and tradition, it was decided that the collection would remain in Tamil Nadu to form the nucleus of a research library. RMRL Trust now maintains this rare private collection of Tamil imprints in collaboration with the University of Chicago.

== Collections ==
The collection at RMRL reflects more than two centuries of Tamil print heritage and culture. The earliest item is a Tamil book, Gnanappatttukalin Postakam, published in 1797. The spectrum of subjects covers language and literature, indigenous medicine, religion, folklore, popular culture, metaphysics, Gandhian studies, women's studies and modern history. It also holds material such as oleographs, theater handbills, wedding invitations and private letters. It is this unique range that sets RMRL apart from other libraries and archives. Considering that Tamil is accorded the status of a classical language and that over sixty million people worldwide speak Tamil, the RMRL presents itself as a significant institution in the world of research and scholarship.

In a bid to augment its already unique collection, the RMRL recently acquired gramophone records from the 1920 and 1930 from private collectors which supplement the existing gramophone song books available at the library. The collection has received and continues to receive generous donations from private collections, growing by almost 50 percent in the last decade.

== Human resources ==
The RMRL's collection is not its sole strength. The library's staff have been trained in premier institutions around the world and having adopted the latest in library technique.

== Indus Research Centre ==
The Roja Muthiah Research Library Trust (RMRLT), Chennai, established the Indus Research Centre (IRC) in January 2007 for undertaking scientific investigations into various aspects of the Indus or Harappan Civilisation, especially the Indus Scripts, which still remains undeciphered. Dr. Iravatham Mahadevan, a well known researcher in the Indus Scripts, is the Honorary Consultant to the Centre, which is open to all bona fide scholars who wish to undertake research in this field.

The Indus Civilization flourished in the Bronze Age, approximately between 3100 and 1700 BCE. The civilization is famous for its large, well-planned urban complexes like Mohenjodara and Harappa (now in Pakistan), and Lothal, Kalibangan, Dholavira and hundreds of other large and small settlements in India, spread over a very large area extending up to Daimabad in the Godavari Valley in Deccan.

The discoveries of Neolithic artifacts in South India bearing Indus Script-like characters has kindled the interest of south India and Tamil scholars who are especially interested in exploring the possibilities of deciphering the Indus Script, which would reveal the linguistic and cultural affinities of the Harappan people.

IRC is intended as a forum for scientific investigations without any ideological bias. The collections at IRC include computerized data and files and card catalogues gifted by Iravatham Mahadevan, collection of Dr.Gift Siromoney on this subject donated by his wife Dr.Rani Siromoney, and other books, monographs and research papers collected from various sources in India and abroad. IRC is in the process of building an exhaustive specialized library covering the Indus Civilization in general, and the Indus Script, in particular.

== See also ==
- Connemara Public Library
- Anna Centenary Library
