= Martin Chautari =

Non profit organisation of Nepal

- मार्टिन चौतारी
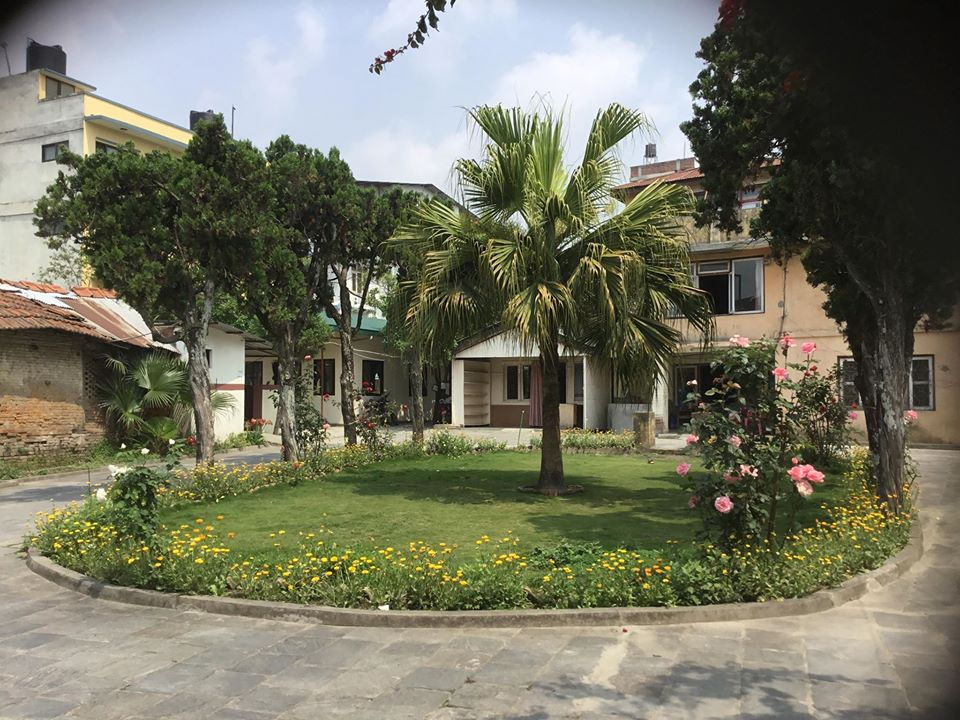
- Years active: 1991–present
- Website: Official Website

Martin Chautari (Nepali: मार्टिन चौतारी) is a non-profit organization in Kathmandu, Nepal established to foster public dialogue and contribute to discussions on current social issues such as democracy, development, civil liberties, and social justice.

In 1991, Martin Chautari began as an informal discussion group in Kathmandu that encouraged development professionals, social activists and academics to meet every two weeks to share insights and experiences related to Nepali development and society. The founders of this discussion group included Nepali power engineer Bikas Pandey, Norwegian engineer Odd Hoftun and Norwegian academic Martin Hoftun. In 1995, the name ‘Martin Chautari’ was adopted in memory of Martin Hoftun, who was tragically killed in an airplane accident in 1992. After being managed by the Centre for Social Research and Development for six years, in 2002 Chautari became registered as a separate non-government organization (NGO) in Kathmandu, Nepal. Its offices are currently located in Thapathali, Kathmandu.

Since its inception, Chautari's core objective was to enhance the quality of public dialogue in Nepal, particularly in matters about development, democracy, civil liberties and social justice. Even as other activities: research, research training, publications, and a library open to the public have been taken up; Chautari's discussion series continue to be its most-known work. Premised on the democratic potential and practice of having face-to-face interactions, Chautari currently organizes two scheduled discussions and seminars a week with speakers and topics drawn from a wide social spectrum. Chautari's discussion and seminar series is the oldest, continuously running such series related to Nepal organized by any institution anywhere in the world.

In addition to the discussion series, Chautari also conducts and supports research, with its main concentration being on media, gender, environmental justice, education, health, social inclusion, and democracy. Since 2009, Chautari has also extended its research to policy issues. By April 2020, 30 policy briefs/briefing papers have been published. In executing its research project, Chautari has trained a new generation of researchers through a rigorous mentoring program that allows the young researchers to immerse themselves in all aspects of the research enterprise.

Chautari also publishes policy briefs, books, and journals (98 books in its Chautari Book Series until mid 2020 and three other books as a co-publisher). Chautari is the editorial home of two journals. The first is the bilingual (English and Nepali) semi-annual journal Studies in Nepali History, and Society; established in 1996, and published by Mandala Book Point from Kathmandu. The second is the Nepali language annual journal Samaj Adhyayan which was established in 2006 as Media Adhyayan (its title was changed in 2016). It is published by Chautari itself. The books published by Chautari are designated Chautari Book Series.

Since 2006, Chautari has opened its reference library and media centre to the public. This has allowed Chautari to provide access to all of its holdings of reference items to students, journalists, activists, and researchers. The library's holdings total about 21,000 books, theses, and reports. The library also holds a small collection of journals, magazines, newspapers, and unpublished seminar papers. A new reading room was opened in 2009 for the benefit of public users.

All five components – the discussions, research, mentoring, publications and library – feed into each other and form an intrinsic part of what Chautari sees as its three chief strategic interests: promoting open dialogue amongst public intellectuals, journalists, academics, social activists, development practitioners, policymakers, and politicians; promoting collaborations amongst academics in Nepal's various colleges, universities and academic NGOs regarding knowledge production; and promoting a new generation of researchers through mentoring and other means.
