= Technological Innovation and Cooperation for Foreign Information Access =

The Technological Innovation and Cooperation for Foreign Information Access (TICFIA) grant program was a United States Department of Education Title VI grant program that provides grants to develop innovative techniques or programs that address national teaching and research needs in international education and foreign languages by using technology to access, collect, organize, preserve, and widely disseminate information on world regions and countries other than the United States.

Funding for TICFIA was cut by congress after the 2010 midterm elections, eliminating the program in 2011.
