= 1787 English cricket season =

Cricket season review

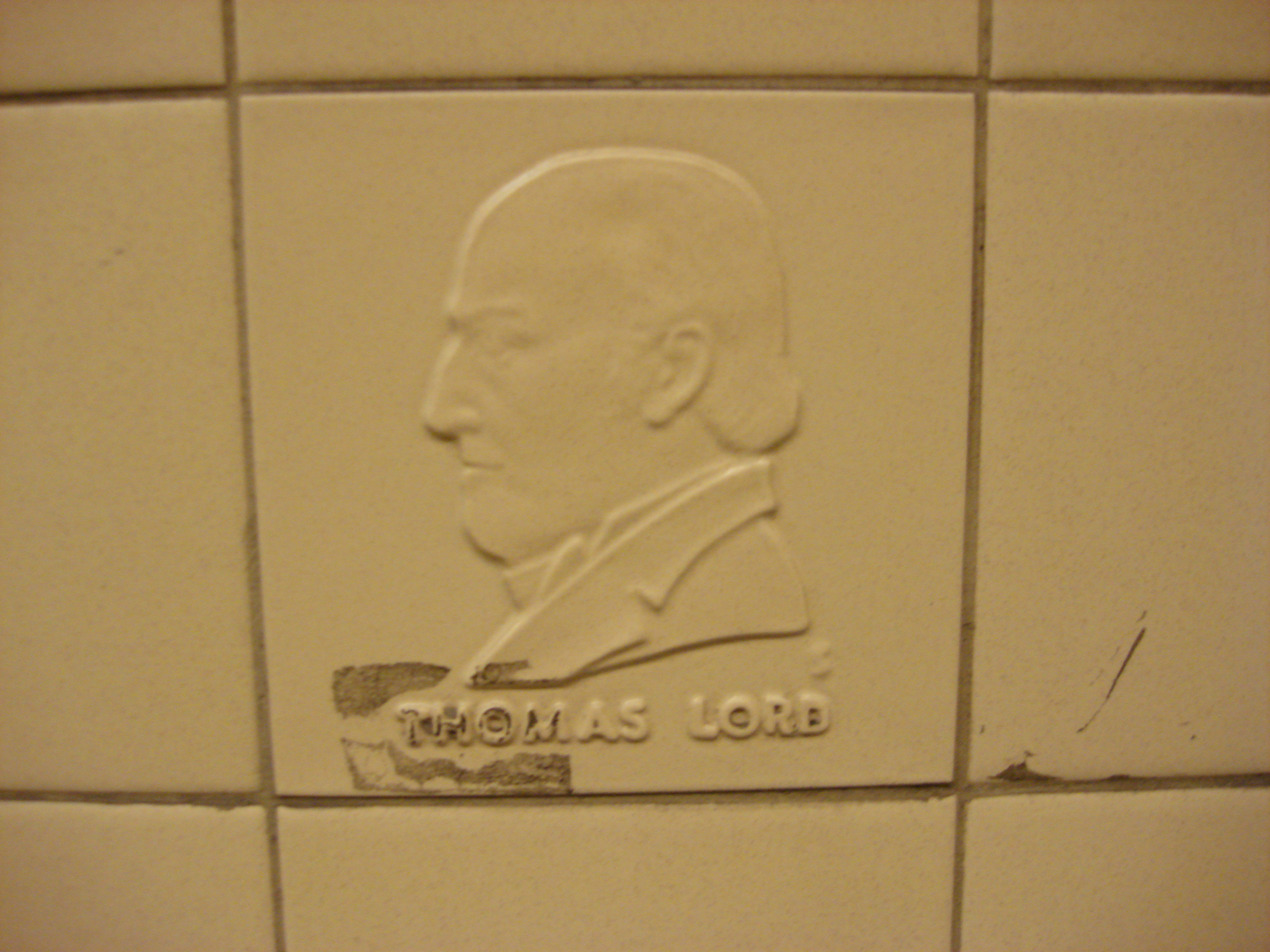
A tile with Thomas Lord's profile in relief at St John's Wood tube station.

The 1787 English cricket season is noted for the foundation of Marylebone Cricket Club (MCC), following the opening of Thomas Lord's first ground in the parish of Marylebone, north of London. MCC soon became the sport's governing body with the new ground as its feature venue. The first match known to have been played at Lord's was on Monday, 21 May, between White Conduit Club and Middlesex. The first match known to involve a team representing MCC was against White Conduit on Monday, 30 July. Including these two, reports and/or match scorecards have survived of numerous historically important eleven-a-side matches played in 1787. (Note: Any match listed in the ACS' Important Match Guide (1981) is historically important, and therefore of the highest standard, whether or not a scorecard might exist. The same applies to numerous matches discovered by researchers since 1981. For further information, see First-class cricket.)

There was one six-a-side single wicket match, played at Lord's, between Kent and Hambledon. Among the season's leading players were batsmen James Aylward and John Small; fast bowler David Harris; and the all-rounders Billy Beldham, Thomas Taylor, Tom Walker and John Wells. The follow-on is first mentioned in sources, having been applied in a match at Hinckley between teams from Leicester and Coventry.

== Lord's and MCC ==
=== Opening of the first Lord's ground ===
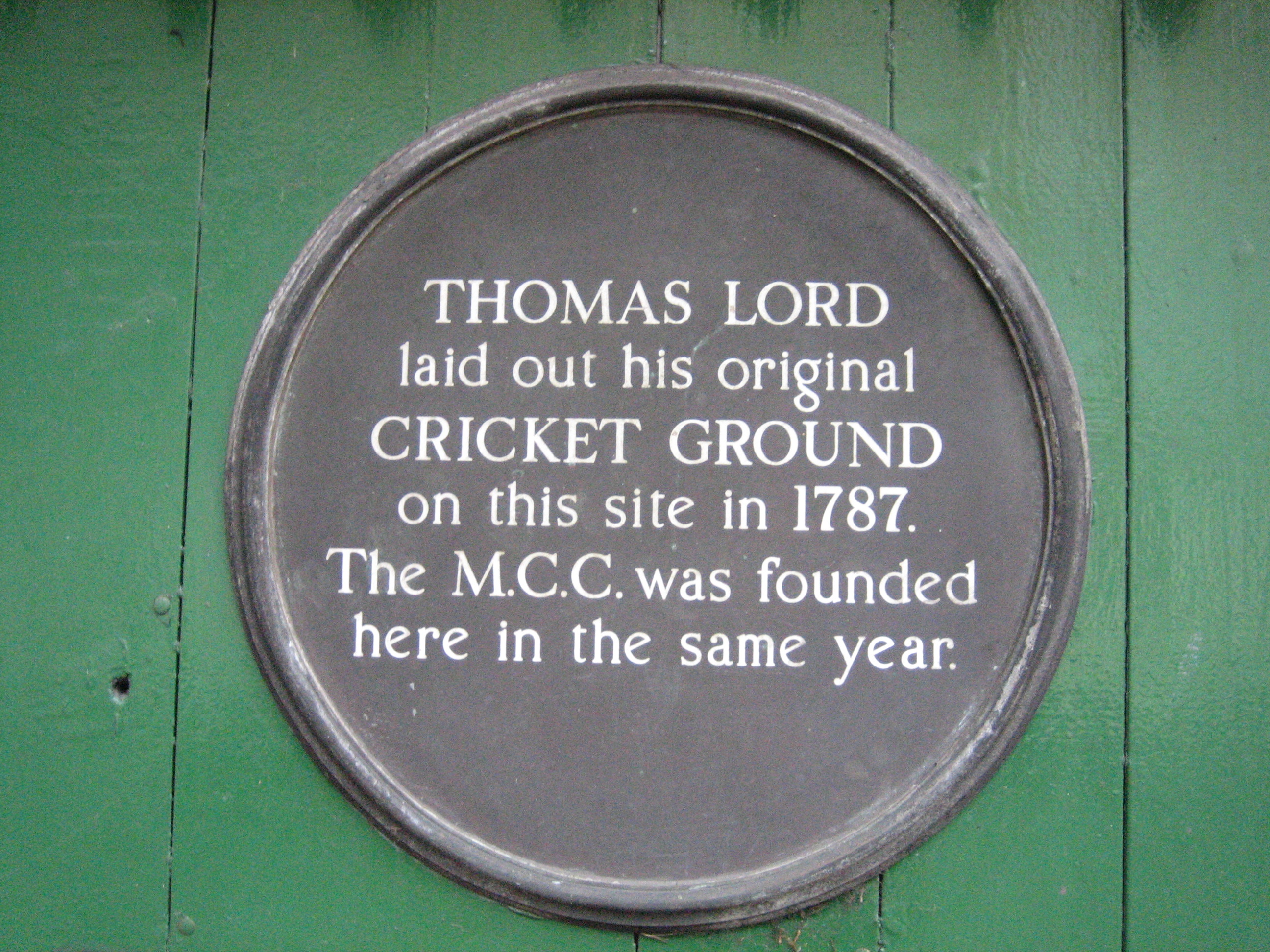
Plaque in Dorset Square to commemorate the site of the original Lord's ground.

Cricket in 1787 was mostly financed by the aristocratic members of the long-standing and multi-functional Noblemen's and Gentlemen's Club which was based at the Star and Garter on Pall Mall in London. The club's members had been largely involved with the hitherto influential Hambledon Club but, as they wanted a venue closer to London than rural Hampshire, they had recently opened the White Conduit Club on White Conduit Fields in Islington. The members soon became dissatisfied with conditions there as White Conduit Fields was common land they could not enclose. Two of White Conduit's leading lights were George Finch, 9th Earl of Winchilsea, then the president of the Hambledon Club, and Colonel Charles Lennox, the future Duke of Richmond. They were aware that Thomas Lord, one of the club's professional bowlers, was reputed to have business acumen and so they commissioned him to find and open a private venue, guaranteeing him against any expenses or losses he might incur. Lord negotiated a lease of land belonging to the Portman Estate in Marylebone. Now known as Lord's Old Ground, it was a seven-acre field which his workers levelled and enclosed with a high fence. It was situated where Dorset Square and Marylebone Station now stand. (Note: There have been three Lord's grounds: the Old Ground (1787–1810); the Middle Ground (1811–1813); and the present Lord's Cricket Ground (1814–), which is generally known as Lord's.)

On Wednesday, 25 April, the following notice appeared in the Morning Herald, a London newspaper:

The Members of the Cricket Club are desired to meet at the Star and Garter, Pall Mall, on Mon., 30 April. Dinner on table exactly at half past five o’clock. N.B. The favour of an answer is desired.

The agenda of that meeting is unknown but, less than four weeks later on Monday, 21 May, Lord's new ground staged its earliest known match when White Conduit played against Middlesex. No details are known other than a pre-announcement in the Morning Herald on Saturday, 19 May:

A grand match will be played on Mon., 21 May, in the New Cricket Ground, the New Road, Mary-le-bone, between eleven Noblemen of the White Conduit Club and eleven Gentlemen of the County of Middlesex with two men given, for 500 guineas a side. The wickets to be pitched at ten o’clock, and the match to be played out.

=== Foundation of the MCC ===
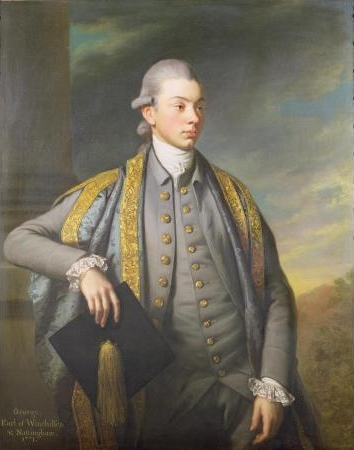
George Finch, 9th Earl of Winchilsea.

Sometime after moving from Islington to Marylebone, the gentlemen's club reconstituted itself as the Marylebone Cricket Club (MCC). The exact date is unknown but a notice in The World on Friday, 27 July announced:

On Mon., 30 July, will be played (at Lord’s) a match between 11 gentlemen of the Mary-le-bone Club and 11 gentlemen of the Islington Club.

The notice is the earliest known mention of a Marylebone Club. Details of the match are unknown and no scorecard has been found. It is not actually certain that MCC was founded in 1787 because, as John Major asserts in More Than A Game, there is "no irrefutable evidence" to support the claim. In due course, MCC took responsibility for the organisation, administration and development of the sport, including ownership of the Laws of Cricket. In his history, H. S. Altham says that White Conduit became MCC in 1788, revising and reissuing the Laws in the same year. On the other hand, the pre-announcement of the match on 30 July 1787 explicitly states that the Marylebone Club would meet the Islington Club. MCC has always regarded 1787 as its foundation year and, in 1837, staged a golden jubilee match to commemorate its 50th anniversary.

=== Matches played at Lord's ===
Lord's is known to have hosted eight matches in 1787. One was an important single wicket match and seven were eleven-a-side matches. No information has been found about the matches on 21 May and 30 July so they cannot be classified and are listed as "other matches". Another unclassified match was played on 5–6 June, when White Conduit again played Middlesex and won by 10 wickets. No scorecard has survived, although the team totals and the players' names are known from newspaper reports.

The second match was on Thursday, 31 May, when Middlesex played Essex. The scorecard has survived and is the earliest of a match played at Lord's. Despite a first innings deficit of 72 runs, Middlesex won the match by 93 runs. They batted first and were all out for 58. Essex scored 130 (Richard Newman 51). Middlesex made 203 in their second innings. Essex needed 132 to win but they were all out for just 38. Stephen Butcher was a bowler from Surrey playing for Essex in this match as a given man. He took ten wickets, all bowled, five in each innings. The scorecard details include "P O Clark" for the dismissals of Middlesex batsmen Z. Boult and William Bedster. This is believed to mean "put out", a term for stumped by the wicket-keeper, who was Thomas Clark. Thomas Lord himself made his first recorded appearance, playing as a bowler for Middlesex. In Scores and Biographies, Arthur Haygarth remarks: "This is the first recorded match played on the original Lord's Ground, which was on the site of Dorset Square". Haygarth did not know of the match on 21 May, the pre-announcement of which was found by G. B. Buckley in the 1930s.

There was a third White Conduit v Middlesex match on 14–15 June. White Conduit batted first and were all out for 80, of which Stephen Butcher scored 30. Middlesex scored 126 to take a first innings lead of 46. Play ended early due to poor light after White Conduit had reached 21 for 3. Next morning, they were all out for 88 (Richard Wyatt 26) and Middlesex scored 45 for 2 (George Louch 16 not out) to win by 8 wickets. John Boorman was credited with six wickets in the match (bowled dismissals only) and the newspaper report says that his bowling "won the game". The same report says White Conduit missed their best bowler, Charles Cumberland, who was sidelined with an ankle injury.

On 20–22 June, White Conduit played England. England scored 247 (James Aylward 93), and 197 (Billy Beldham 63); White Conduit scored 112 and 67 to be convincingly beaten by 239 runs. Aylward was run out for 93, which was the season's highest individual score. Beldham and John Wells are listed as debutants.

On 2–4 August, Lord's hosted an important single wicket match between six-a-side teams representing Kent and the Hambledon Club. Batting first, Kent scored 53 all out (Joey Ring 24). Hambledon replied with 27 and then bowled Kent out for just 13. Needing 40 to win, Hambledon in turn were dismissed for 16 and so Kent won by 23 runs. David Harris took eleven of the twelve Kent wickets.

Towards the end of the season, on 10–12 September, there was a match between teams selected by the Earl of Winchilsea and Sir Horatio Mann. Mann's XI opened with 116 (Harry Walker 44) and then dismissed Winchilsea's XI for 84 (Thomas Taylor 23 not out; Lumpy Stevens 3w). In their second innings, Mann's XI scored 123 (Tom Walker 40; David Harris 3w). Winchilsea's XI needed 156 to win but were all out for 61 (Francis Booker 22; Lumpy Stevens 3w) and so Mann's XI won by 94 runs.

== Important matches ==
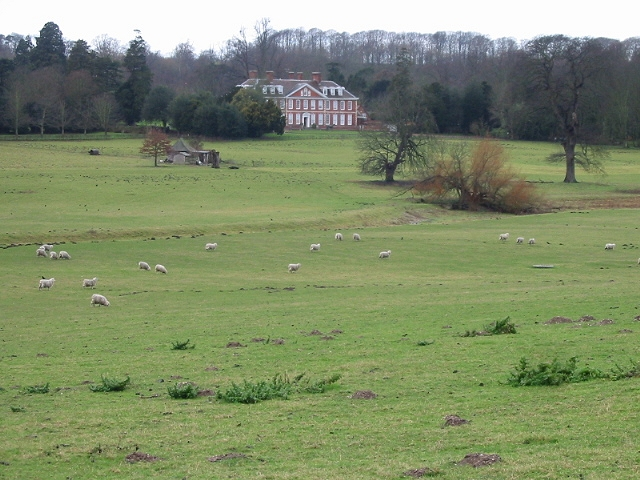
Bourne Park House at Bishopsbourne, a 1787 venue

Of the many eleven-a-side matches known to have been played in 1787, four, described above, were played at Lord's and the other seven at venues across the south of England.

Hampshire played Kent three times in inter-county matches at Coxheath on 7–10 August, Bishopsbourne Paddock on 14–16 August, and Windmill Down on 3–5 September. In all three, the away team won. Hampshire won by 2 wickets at Coxheath and by 266 runs at Bishopsbourne. At Windmill Down, however, Kent won by 65 runs. Haygarth says Hampshire at Coxheath is called England in another account but the players were all members of the Hambledon Club and so it was in reality Hampshire. In the match at Windmill Down, there were seven run outs of Hampshire batsmen.

In two matches, the Hornchurch club played against a combined team representing White Conduit and Moulsey Hurst. The first, on 15–16 May, was probably played at Langton Park, Hornchurch, but that is not certain. Of the 22 players, twelve are listed as debutants. The combined team won by 6 wickets. The return match was played at Moulsey Hurst on 3–4 July and ended in another victory for the combined team, this time by 131 runs.

In addition to the match at Lord's in September, the Earl of Winchilsea's XI took part in two other matches. The first was against Assheton Smith's XI at Perriam Down, near Ludgershall, Wiltshire, on 16 July; the second was against Sir Horatio Mann's XI at Bishopsbourne on 28–31 August (the Lord's match was the return to this). Winchilsea's XI won by 79 runs against Assheton Smith's XI. They won by 29 runs against Mann's XI. All-rounder William Fennex, playing for Mann's XI at Bishopsbourne, dismissed ten batsmen in the match by means of six catches and four bowled; he took five catches in the second innings alone.

== Other matches ==
Reports have survived of several other matches which lack information. They include White Conduit v Middlesex (21 May); White Conduit v Middlesex (5–6 June); and MCC v White Conduit (30 July) – these were all played at Lord's and are described above.

Essex (called Hornchurch in some sources) played Middlesex at Langton Park on 5 July. The team totals are known but none of the players. Essex scored 65 and 108; Middlesex replied with 124 and 50–1 to win by 9 wickets. On the same day, West Sussex met East Sussex at Amberley Hill, near Amberley, West Sussex. West Sussex won by 101 runs. The match, of a minor standard, was restricted to amateur players resident in the county with the west–east divide centred on Arundel.

In Hampshire, the Alresford and Odiham clubs played each other home and away, both matches being won by Alresford. There was a match at Swanscombe, near Dartford, on 16 July between teams called Kent and Essex, but all that is known is the result – Essex won by innings and 44 runs. Another match involving Essex was played at Langton Park on 2–3 August against White Conduit who won by "over 100 runs".

Further north, a team from Leicester played two matches. The first, against a Coventry team was on 6–7 August at a venue in Hinckley. Leicester won by 45 runs and the match was the subject of an extensive report in a local newspaper. In September, Leicester were away to a Melton Mowbray team and were defeated by an innings and 16 runs.

== The follow-on ==
The first mention of the follow-on occurs in 1787.

In the Leicester v Coventry match at Hinckley in August, Coventry batted first and were all out for 23. Leicester were all out for 13 in reply, and were obliged to bat again next. In their second innings, Leicester made 132; Coventry, needing 123 to win, were all out for 77, meaning Leicester won by 45 runs after having to follow-on.

According to Rowland Bowen, it was the unofficial custom in some parts of the country for the team behind on first innings to bat next, regardless of the size of the deficit.

== First mentions ==
=== Clubs and teams ===
- Earl of Winchilsea's XI
- Marylebone Cricket Club (MCC)

=== Players ===
Movement of the sport's centre of activity from the rural counties to north London led to an unusually high number of players being named as 'debutants' in 1787, though most were, or would have been, playing earlier without being recorded. This list is limited to the highest-class players only:

- Stephen Butcher (Surrey/Kent)
- Thomas Clark (Essex/Hornchurch)
- Robert Denn (Essex/Hornchurch)
- Thomas Ingram (Surrey)
- Thomas Lord (Middlesex)
- John Pilcher (Kent)
- John Wells (Surrey)

== Venues ==
- Lord's Old Ground

== Bibliography ==
- ACS (1981). A Guide to Important Cricket Matches Played in the British Isles 1709–1863. Nottingham: ACS. OCLC 85045528.
- Altham, H. S.; Swanton, E. W. (1962). A History of Cricket, Volume 1 (to 1914) (5th ed.). London: George Allen & Unwin. OCLC 894274808.
- Birley, Derek (1999). A Social History of English Cricket. London: Aurum Press. ISBN 978-18-54107-10-7 – via Internet Archive.
- Bowen, Rowland (1970). Cricket: A History of its Growth and Development. London: Eyre & Spottiswoode. ISBN 978-04-13278-60-9.
- Buckley, G. B. (1935). Fresh Light on 18th Century Cricket. Birmingham: Cotterell & Co. OCLC 23450280.
- Buckley, G. B. (1937). Fresh Light on pre-Victorian Cricket. Birmingham: Cotterell & Co. OCLC 23469107.
- Haygarth, Arthur (1996) [1862]. Scores & Biographies, Volume 1 (1744–1826). Kennington: Frederick Lillywhite. ISBN 978-19-00592-23-9.
- Major, John (2007). More Than A Game. London: HarperCollins. ISBN 978-00-07183-64-7 – via Internet Archive.
- Waghorn, H. T. (2005) [1906]. The Dawn of Cricket. London: J. W. McKenzie. ISBN 978-09-47821-17-3.
