= Beldham =

Beldham is a surname. Notable people with this surname include:

- Billy Beldham (1766–1862), English cricket player
- George Beldham (born 1758), English cricket player, brother of Billy
- John Beldham (fl. 1790s), English cricket player

Beldham may also refer to:

- The Beldham (film), a 2024 horror film directed by Angela Gulner
