= Billy Beldham =

English cricketer (1766–1862)

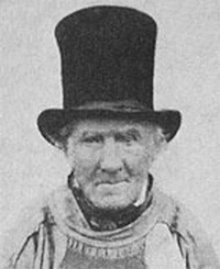
- Beldham (c.1860) in old age

Personal information
- Full name: William Beldham
- Born: 5 February 1766; Wrecclesham, Surrey, England
- Died: 26 February 1862 (aged 96); Tilford, Surrey, England
- Nickname: Silver Billy
- Batting: Right-handed
- Bowling: Right arm fast medium (underarm)
- Role: Batting all-rounder

Domestic team information
- Years: Team
- 1782–1786: Farnham
- 1785–1807: Hambledon/Hampshire (Note: Hambledon was a multi-faceted social club that organised county matches played by Hampshire but some important matches were played by the club itself and the team title was interchangeable. It is also believed that the county team was a combination of Hampshire and Sussex during Hambledon's tenure.)
- 1788–1817: Surrey
- 1790–1818: Marylebone Cricket Club (MCC)
- 1787–1820: England

William "Silver Billy" Beldham (5 February 1766 – 26 February 1862) was an English professional cricketer who played for numerous teams between 1782 and 1821. He was born at Wrecclesham, near Farnham in Surrey, and died at Tilford, Surrey. In some sources, his name has been given as "Beldam" or "Beldum". A right-handed batting all-rounder, he is widely recognised as one of the greatest batsmen of cricket's underarm era. Using an underarm action, he bowled pitched deliveries at a fast medium pace. He generally fielded in close catching positions, mostly at slip and sometimes played as wicket-keeper.

Beldham began his career locally with Farnham Cricket Club. He was soon invited to join the Hambledon Club and became mainly associated with the county teams of Hampshire and Surrey. He regularly played for England teams from 1787 until 1820 and also in many matches for Marylebone Cricket Club (MCC).

== Early life ==
Beldham was born on 5 February 1766 in the village of Wrecclesham, near Farnham in Surrey, where his family had a farm. His exact birthplace has not been precisely identified but may have been Yew Tree Cottage (built in the early 16th century) as in 1820 – the year before his retirement and move to Tilford – the house was surrendered by a William Beldham to a John Wells (the significance being that Beldham's brother-in-law was fellow cricketer "Honest" John Wells): additionally, there is a strong local tradition that this was his birthplace.

Beldham was the fourth of six children (and the third son) of George Beldham (1728–1811) and Ann Benfil (or Bonfil) (1728–1793), and his ancestry in the area can be traced back at least seven generations to Allen Beldham (born mid-16th century). Nothing is known of his schooling but, as he was able to sign his name on his first marriage certificate as opposed to making a witnessed mark, it is likely he had a basic grounding.

Much that is known about Beldham (and, indeed, about cricket in the late eighteenth century) is based on discussions he had with the Reverend James Pycroft in 1837 when Beldham was 71 years old. Beldham's reminiscences, and those of his friend William Fennex, provide the basis of Pycroft's The Cricket Field (1854) and Oxford memories: a retrospect after fifty years (1886). Beldham's earliest recollection of cricket is a match in 1780 when his local team, Farnham Cricket Club, defeated the Hambledon Club. He would have been 14 at the time but he told Pycroft that he overheard a remark by the Reverend Charles Powlett who said: "Here I have been thirty years raising our club, and are we to be beaten by a mere parish?" This statement suggests that the Hambledon Club was founded c.1750 but that is doubtful and David Underdown warns against "relying too much on Beldham's memory".

== Cricket career ==
Beldham's recorded career spanned the 1782 to 1821 seasons, and is one of the longest on record. The number of matches he played in cannot be computed because of missing or incomplete match scorecards but even a conservative estimate is well over 250. (Note: Any match listed in the ACS' Important Match Guide (1981) is historically important, and therefore of the highest standard, whether or not a scorecard might exist. The same applies to numerous matches discovered by researchers since 1981. For further information, see First-class cricket.)

=== Farnham and Odiham (c.1782–c.1786) ===
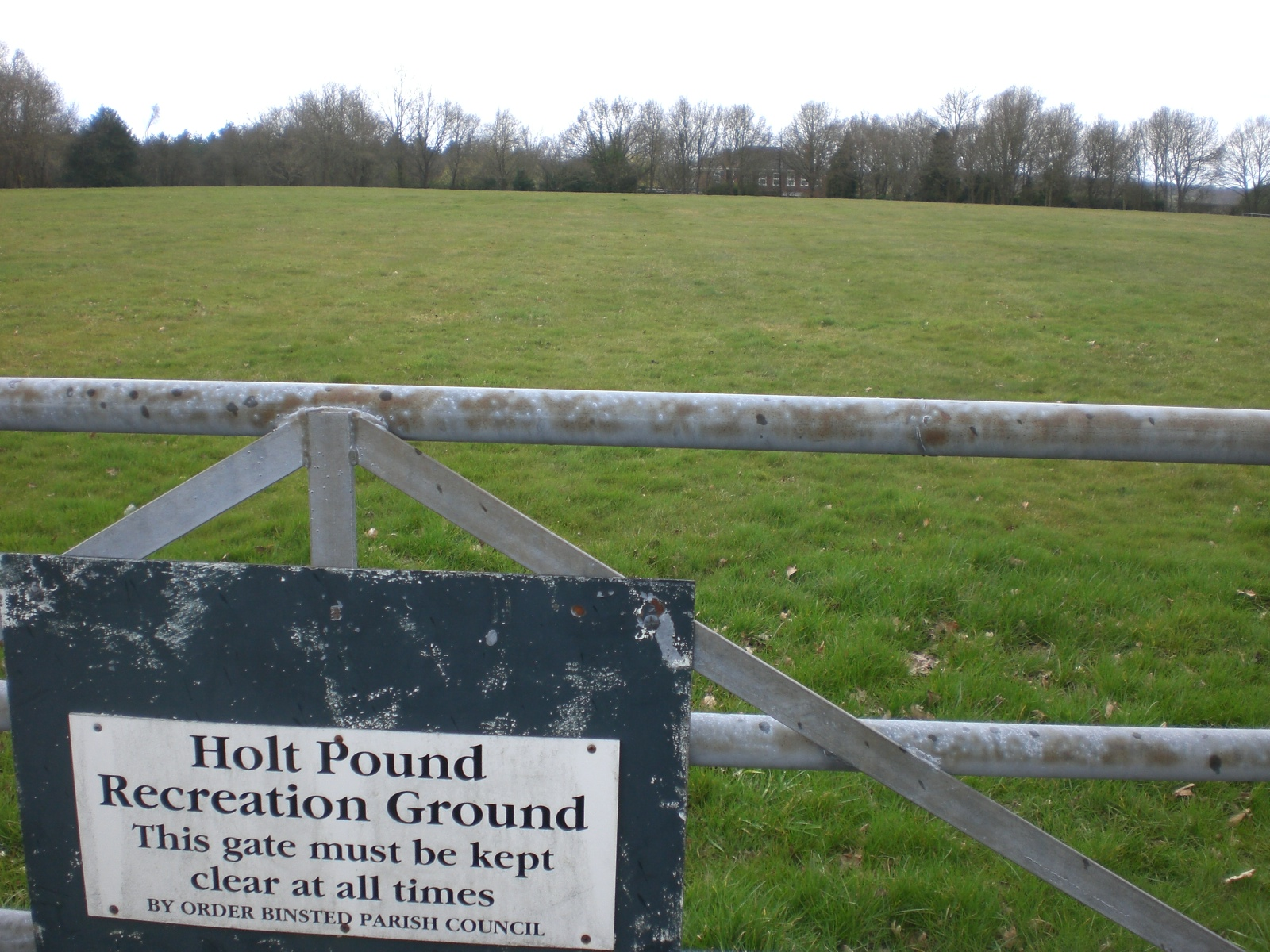
Holt Pound Oval in 2010

The earliest mention of Billy Beldham seems to be in a reference to two players called Beldum (sic) who represented Farnham Cricket Club in its earliest known match at Odiham Down on 13 August 1782. Farnham, who won, included J. Wells (probably James Wells), G. Beldum (almost certainly Beldham's elder brother George) and Beldum (no initial), who scored 1 and 16. If the latter was Billy Beldham, he would have been sixteen years old. In October 1782, there was a Beldham (unspecified) in the Odiham team for two matches against Berkshire, and again in May the following year against Maidenhead.

No Farnham matches are recorded in 1783, and only one in 1784. That was against Odiham & Alton at the Holt Pound Oval, in which both Billy & George played. This was a new ground in 1784. The Beldhams were commissioned to lay out the pitch by local landowner Lord Stawell (1757–1820), who was a Hambledon Club member and a Farnham player. The match against Odiham & Alton was arranged for 30 July 1784, following a postponement because of bad weather. The teams are known but not the result. The Farnham team included Stawell and the Beldham brothers. A return match was arranged at Odiham Down on 4 August but, again, there is no report of it being played.

In 1785, Farnham had a more extensive fixture list comprising matches with Alresford, a home-and-away series with Petworth – or, more accurately, Petworth, Northchapel & Tillington with six of Hambledon – which led to three matches against the Hambledon Club itself for a purse of £100 (equivalent to £13,579 in 2025). Farnham were outclassed in the first match at home, losing by an innings and 119 runs: the scores of the second and third games at Windmill Down have been lost, but Beldham's comments when interviewed by Pycroft some 50 years later indicate that Farnham won at least one of them, and quite possibly both for, in June 1786, Hambledon declined a challenge from Farnham. On 28 July 1786, Farnham were scheduled to play against "seven of Hambledon with four picked men from Sussex" on Northchapel Green, near Chichester. However, the result of this match has not been found. In other matches in 1786, Farnham were pitted against such varied opposition as Berkshire, Warfield (twice), a Guildford & Godalming XXII, and a Godalming XII with four of Hambledon. Given his absence from the Hambledon scorecards that year, it is possible that Beldham played in some of the Farnham matches.

=== Hambledon/Hampshire (1785–1807) ===
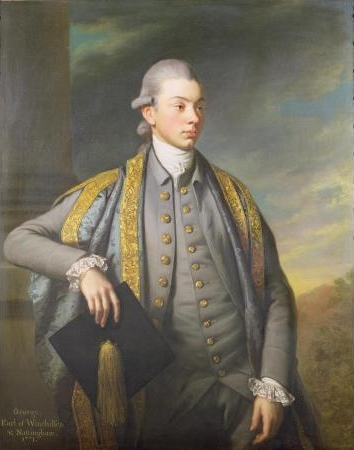
George Finch, 9th Earl of Winchilsea

In his reminiscences to Pycroft, Beldham said that, when he was eighteen years old (i.e., in the 1784 season), he had played for Farnham against Hambledon and scored 43 facing an attack that included David Harris. He was watched by George Finch, 9th Earl of Winchilsea who was cricket's most influential patron at the time. Next spring, Winchilsea visited Beldham at the farm where he worked and arranged with his employer, Mr Hilton, for him to have time off for playing cricket. Beldham was invited to play for Hampshire in June 1785 against England at White Conduit Fields and that was the start of his career in important matches. It was also the beginning of his contract with the Hambledon Club, which continued through the latter years of the club's golden era until c.1794. In the minutes of the weekly club meeting of 26 July 1785, it was "order'd that John & James Wells, Wm. and George Beldham be seen as Players belonging to this Club and be paid their Expences when they come to play at the discretion of the stewards". He and his brother George and their brothers-in-law, John and James Wells travelled 27 miles each way between Farnham and Hambledon, usually on the day of the match. Saddle-soreness made them consider building a cart for their journeys but the government introduced a tax on vehicles and they abandoned the idea.

Beldham recalled that he was paid five guineas a game in the 1780s if his team won and three guineas if they lost, plus two guineas for Tuesday's practise. Twenty years later the figures were six and four. This was a pittance compared with the money that the gentry could make from their wagers (e.g., Lord Frederick Beauclerk remarked that he made some £630 a year from cricket), but it was a good income compared with those of artisans and labourers: at the time the weekly wage of a farm labourer was something like seven shillings and sixpence. Thus, to take the 1788 season as an example, Beldham played in 10 known matches, his team winning six of them, for which he was paid 42 guineas (£44.2s.0d), equating to slightly over two and a quarter years' wages for a farm worker.

There is no other mention in surviving sources of the June 1785 match between England and Hampshire; Beldham does not confirm that it was actually played, only planned. He may have played for Farnham in 1785 and 1786, or in Hambledon matches without surviving reports. There are several mentions of him in 1787, when he was 21, and his career was certainly underway by the end of that season, which is best remembered for the foundation of Marylebone Cricket Club (MCC) following the opening of the original Lord's ground. The first Hambledon match in which Beldham is definitely recorded was not until 7–10 August 1787 when he played against Kent at the Star Inn Ground on Coxheath Common. In his summary, Haygarth said another account had called the match "Kent v England". Haygarth used Hambledon in his title because, as he said, all eleven players were "members of the Hambledon Club". Kent batted first and were all out for 140. Hambledon replied with 256 and Beldham, although he was number 10 in the order, made the second-highest score with 42 before he was again bowled by Clifford. Kent were all out for 194 in their second innings and Beldham held three catches. Hambledon finished the match with 79/8 to win by 2 wickets, Beldham scoring 14 before being caught by Clifford.

One of Beldham's finest performances was for Hambledon in a 1789 match at Lord's Old Ground against an England Thirteen. England batted first and scored 118, Beldham holding three catches. Hambledon struggled against the bowling of Robert Clifford and John Boorman. They were all out for 150 and nine of the batsmen, plus extras, scored only 17 between them. The other 133 were scored by Richard Purchase with 39 and Beldham with 94. He held two more catches as England were dismissed for 73 in their second innings. Hambledon needed 42 to win and Beldham scored 16 not out to see them through with 6 wickets in hand.

=== England (1787–1820) ===
Beldham's first match at Lord's was his known debut for England. (Note: Teams called England had been formed since the 1730s. They were by no means international or even national. Cricket in the 18th century was mostly confined to the south-eastern counties around London, and an England team of the time consisted of players from these counties. The teams were in the nature of "Rest of England" and were formed to play against a strong club or county team.) Arthur Haygarth presents his biography of Beldham, and that of his brother-in-law John Wells, after the summary of this match. Haygarth says of both players that it was their "first recorded match", but earlier ones have been discovered by later researchers. The match was against the White Conduit Club, the Islington-based forerunner of MCC, on 20–22 June 1787. England batted first and scored 247. Beldham was number 8 in the batting order and scored 17 before he was bowled by Robert Clifford. White Conduit Club had six given men who were all leading Hampshire and Kent professionals. Beldham took two wickets, bowling Winchilsea for 3 and Edward Hussey for 21, as the club were dismissed for 112. With a first innings deficit of 135, White Conduit would normally have batted again but England took the third innings and scored 197. Beldham made the top score with 63 before he was run out. White Conduit were all out for 93, Beldham holding one catch and bowling both Joey Ring and Tom Walker.

Beldham played for England teams for over thirty years until his last at the current Lord's ground on 3–5 July 1820. His performances have been recorded in 41 of these matches. His highest known score for England was 91 against Hampshire at Perriam Downs on 25–28 July 1791, a four-day match that England won by an innings and 67 runs. Hampshire were all out for 79 and 129 with England scoring 275. Beldham, third in the order, was caught by George Leycester.

As late as June 1819, when he was 53, Beldham could still justify selection for England. There were two England v Hampshire matches that month, both at Lord's. England won the first, which was a twelve-a-side match, by an innings and 5 runs. Hampshire, batting first, were all out for 113. Beldham played as wicket-keeper and dismissed three batsman: two caught, one stumped. England scored 245 and Beldham, fifth in the order, made top score with 79. He dismissed two more batsmen in the Hampshire second innings as they were all out for 127. Haygarth's comment about Beldham's performance was: "considering he was now fifty-three years of age, very wonderful". Three weeks later, the teams met again in an eleven-a-side match which England won by 7 wickets. Hampshire were all out for 95 and England replied with 177. Beldham was number three and scored 72. In the second innings, Hampshire were all out for 141 and England scored 60/3 to win the match with a day to spare. Haygarth again commented on a "wonderful performance" by Beldham. A report of the match said Beldham was punishing the fast bowling of George Brown so much that "Brown was afraid to bowl at him".

=== Surrey (1788–1817) ===
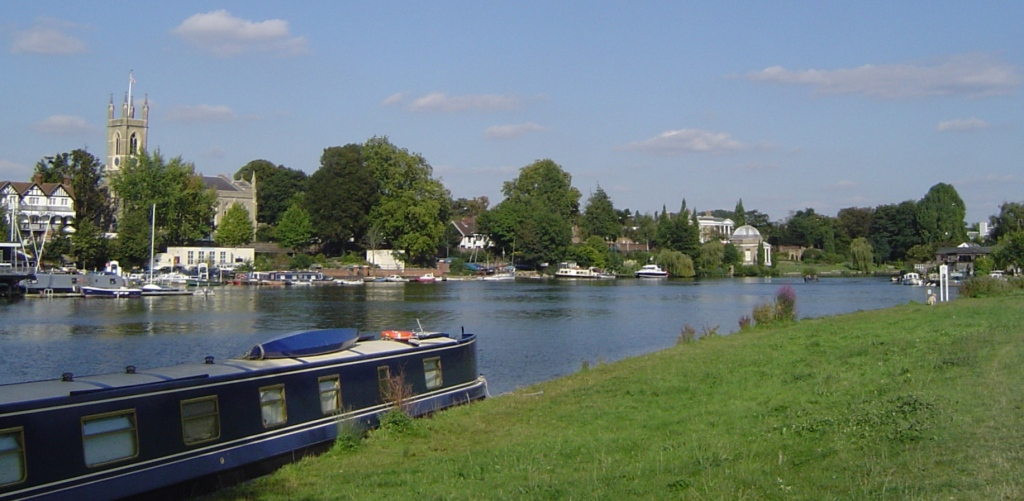
The River Thames at Moulsey Hurst, a popular sporting venue in the 18th century.

Despite his long association with Hampshire, Beldham was a Surrey man and he played for his county's team on many occasions, 52 matches being documented. His first appearance was in June 1788 against Hampshire, his last in June 1817 against England. Beldham's known Surrey debut was in a low-scoring match at Moulsey Hurst on 9–10 June 1788. Hampshire batted first and were all out for 59, Beldham taking two catches. Surrey scored 90 (Beldham 10) and then Hampshire were all out for 63 in their second innings. Surrey scored 33/1 to win by 9 wickets; Beldham did not bat. A few weeks later, on 3–5 July, Beldham played for Surrey against Hampshire on Perriam Downs in a match that featured a remarkable turnaround. Surrey opened with 203, Beldham scoring 59 and sharing in a large 3rd wicket stand with Harry Walker who made 78. Hampshire were all out for 110; Beldham bowled two and caught two. With a lead of 93, Surrey looked well set but they collapsed in the second innings and were all out for 44 (Beldham 8). Hampshire still needed 138 to win in conditions that did not favour batting, but they made it with four wickets to spare.

There were matches between Surrey and England every year from 1793 to 1810. The strength of Surrey in some seasons meant England playing as a XIII against Surrey's XI. In the match at Dartford Brent on 22–24 July 1793, Beldham opened the innings for Surrey and carried his bat with a score of 106 not out in a total of 171; the second highest score was 18 by his opening partner Harry Walker. England were all out for 113, Beldham holding two catches. He scored only 5 in the second innings, when he was bowled by Thomas Boxall. Surrey scored 83 but then bowled England out for 88, Beldham again holding two catches, to win by 53 runs.

Beldham produced one of his greatest performances in the England v Surrey match at Lord's Old Ground on 9–11 June 1794. He opened the first innings and top-scored with 72, leading Surrey to a total of 223. England were all out for 88, Beldham bowling two and catching one. In Surrey's second innings, Beldham and Harry Walker both scored centuries. Beldham was bowled by Fennex for 102; Walker was 115 not out when Surrey apparently declared at 259/5. England could not have hoped to reach their target of 395 and were all out for 197 which meant Surrey won by 197 runs. Harry Altham mentioned this match in his history, saying that Beldham was "at his zenith".

The Surrey v England matches ended after 1810 as the latter years of the Napoleonic Wars demanded more of British manpower and resources. Beldham was 49 at the time of Waterloo in 1815 when cricket began its recovery from the impact of the war. He continued his career but is known to have made only one more appearance for Surrey. This was in the England v Surrey match at Lord's (the current ground) on 10–17 June 1817. Surrey batted first and were all out for 114 but Beldham made the top score with 27. England replied with 136 to take the lead. Surrey lost four wickets cheaply but then Beldham was joined by George Osbaldeston and they rescued the innings. Beldham was bowled by Beauclerk for 41 and Osbaldeston made 60; the total was 168. England scored 147/5 to win by 5 wickets.

=== Marylebone Cricket Club (1790–1818) ===
As a professional, Beldham made occasional appearances for Marylebone Cricket Club (MCC) on an individual match basis as a given man. He is known to have played in 42 matches involving MCC but 13 of them were for the opposition. The club was still fairly new when Beldham made his earliest known appearance for them in August 1790, and he made at least 29 to his last in August 1818 when he was 52 years old. His first two matches were against Middlesex between 16 and 20 August 1790. The first was at Lord's Old Ground and the return on Uxbridge New Ground. In both, Beldham and Robert Clifford were named as given men for MCC and they shared most of the workload by opening the batting and doing most if not all of the bowling. MCC won the Lord's match by 2 wickets. Beldham scored 24 and 16 in totals of 145 and 142/8. He made a significant contribution in the field as he was involved in at least nine dismissals: five bowled and four caught.

At Uxbridge, MCC batted first and were in difficulty against William Fennex and Thomas Lord. Beldham scored only 3 and was bowled by Fennex. MCC's total was 110 but Beldham and Clifford had the Middlesex batsmen in trouble too and dismissed them for 89, of which Fennex scored 41 and was out hit wicket. In MCC's second innings, Beldham played well to score 46 out of 101 before he was again bowled by Fennex. Middlesex needed 123 to win but were all out for 66, Beldham bowling three and holding one catch, so MCC won by 56 runs.

Beldham was often on the winning team but, even when his team lost, he tended to play well in adversity. There was an example of that in May 1791 when he and Richard Purchase were MCC's given men for two matches against Middlesex, both at Lord's Old Ground. The first match was on 16–18 May and Beldham bowled five Middlesex batsmen in their first innings of 110. As bowlers were only credited with a wicket when the batsman was bowled out, there are few recorded instances of five wickets in an innings. It happened twice in this match as Fennex emulated Beldham with five MCC men bowled. Beldham made the top score of 44 not out in a total of 145, a first innings lead of 35. Middlesex scored 166 in the second innings to set a target of 132. This time, Beldham could not deliver and he was bowled by Fennex for 1. Apart from 44 by Purchase, the other professional in the team, MCC collapsed to 101 and Middlesex won by 30 runs.

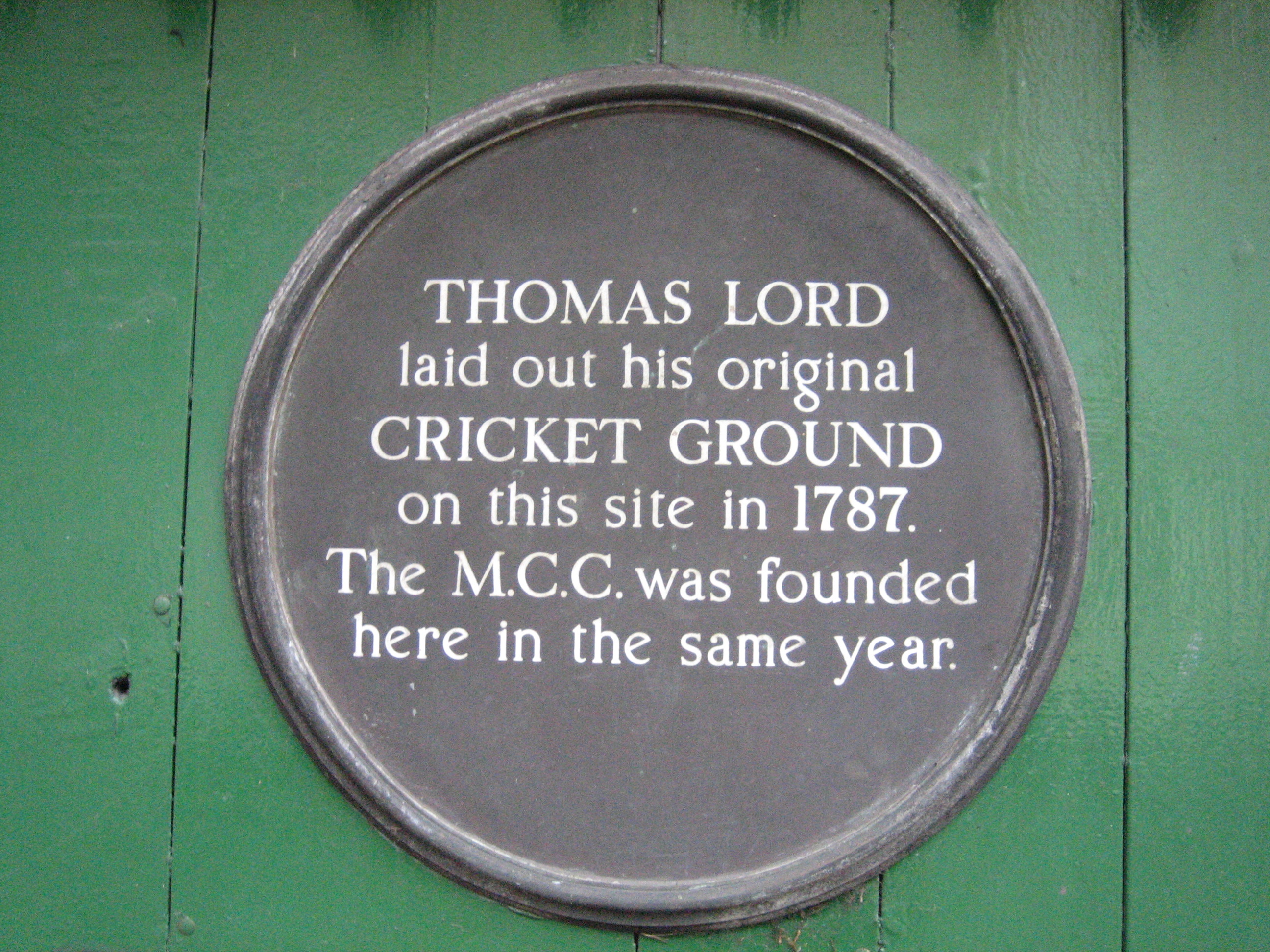
Commemorative plaque on the site of Lord's Old Ground. Beldham made his highest score there in 1792.

The second match was a week later on 23–25 May. MCC opened and Beldham scored 62 in their total of 190. Middlesex lost their first five wickets cheaply but then Fennex and George T. Boult made a stand. Fennex scored 61 and Boult 89. William Bedster added 53 and there were good scores by two of the tail-enders so, despite their poor start, Middlesex totalled 284 – anything well over 200 was a high score in 18th century pitch conditions. Beldham had bowled two batsmen. MCC started their second innings 94 behind and were all out for 150. Beldham with 43 was again their top scorer and that gave him a match total of 105. He held two catches as Middlesex reached 57/4 to win by 6 wickets.

Beldham made three known centuries in his career. His highest score was 144 for MCC against Middlesex at Lord's Old Ground. The match was played 7–9 May 1792. Beldham and Tom Walker were MCC's given men. MCC batted first and Walker scored 107 in a total of 193. Beldham was out for 13. The two professionals then combined as bowlers to dismiss Middlesex for 111. MCC batted again and, after Walker was out for 0, Beldham led them to the very high (for the time) total of 306. He had useful support from three of the MCC amateurs and had made 144 when he was bowled by Bedster. At the time, the highest score by any batsman on record was 167 by James Aylward in 1777. Middlesex were all out for 114 and MCC won by a massive 274 runs. To Haygarth, a match total of 724 was very high. (Note: Until the 1890s, pitch preparation was rudimentary at best. A level pitch was rare and there was no covering of the ground so the pitches were permanently exposed to the weather. Such prevailing conditions heavily favoured the bowlers because every delivery was unpredictable. The conditions could cause any ball to deviate and so deceive even the best batsmen. While match totals of over 1,000 have been common since the end of the 19th century, they were almost unthinkable in earlier times when a match total over, say, 500 was worthy of note; hence Haygarth's comment that 724 runs were scored in the May 1792 match.)

Beldham was frequently selected by MCC until 1809 when he took part in two matches against England but there was then a gap of seven years until he played for them again in 1816. Cricket as a whole suffered badly during the later years of the Napoleonic Wars and there was a considerable reduction in the number of matches played, especially in the 1810 to 1814 seasons. Beldham played for MCC twice more in 1818 when he was 52 years old. In these last three MCC matches, he made scores of 36 out of 100, 49 of 127 and 31 of 112.

=== Gentlemen v Players (1806–1821) ===
In 1806, Beldham had the unusual record of playing for both the Gentlemen and the Players in the inaugural and second Gentlemen v Players matches. He and William Lambert played as given men for the Gentlemen in the first match at the original Lord's ground on 7–9 July 1806. Beldham scored 16, held three catches and bowled William Fennex. Lambert made the top score of the match with 57. The Players were dismissed for 69 and 112, the Gentlemen scored 195 to win by an innings and 14 runs. For the second match on 21 and 25 July (there was an unscheduled break), Beldham was in the Players team but the Gentlemen retained Lambert. Beldham contributed little, scoring 0 and 1; also, he is not known to have been involved in any dismissals. The Gentlemen scored 96 and 132, the Players 65 and 81. The Gentlemen won by 82 runs. (Note: Scorecards during Beldham's career did not record the name of the bowler if the batsman was caught or stumped – only the name of the fielder. The bowler was only credited with the wicket if he bowled the batsman out. In 1836, MCC agreed to include bowlers' names in scorecards for all dismissals except run out.)

Beldham made three further appearances in the fixture after it was resurrected in 1819, when he was 53 years old. In 1819, on the present Lord's ground, the Players recorded their first victory over the Gentlemen. Beldham scored 15 in the first innings as the Players made 199 to gain a first innings lead of one run. The Gentlemen were all out for 60 in their second innings and the Players replied with 60/4 to win by 6 wickets. Beldham did not bat. Fast medium bowler Thomas Howard had an outstanding match for the Players, being involved in at least nine dismissals including eight bowled. In 1820, Howard was again the matchwinner but this time as a given man for the Gentlemen. He was involved in nine dismissals as they won by 70 runs. Beldham scored 16 and 2.

=== Other teams and matches ===
There were no organised competitions in the 18th century and all matches were arranged on a more or less ad hoc basis, so prolific players like Beldham appeared for a wide variety of teams. As described above, Beldham was mainly associated with Hambledon and Surrey while he was frequently invited to represent MCC and England teams. Among other teams he played for were counties like Berkshire, Kent (eight times) and Middlesex, always as a given man. MCC at the time was in some respects a town club and Beldham played in matches for other local clubs such as Godalming and Homerton.

Many matches were arranged by patrons for the purpose of gambling and, as there were no restrictions on nomenclature, some are known by curious titles such as "Right-handed v Left-handed" (Beldham was right-handed) and "A to M v N to Z". There are five of the latter, all played between August 1787 and June 1789. In one of these, played at Bishopsbourne Paddock on 26–29 August 1788, Beldham scored 45 out of 94 in the first innings and 51 of 141 in the second. N to Z were dismissed for 100 and 60, so Beldham's team won by 75 runs. Teams were often named after their patrons with titles such as Earl of Winchilsea's XI or Lord F. Beauclerk's XI. Beldham appeared in over 60 matches for occasional teams of that type, including six for Winchilsea's XI and five for Winchilsea's opponents.

Another curiosity team was "The Bs", formed on occasion between 1805 and 1832. Beldham played for the Bs four times. One of these was the famous match at Lord's Old Ground on 12–14 June 1810 when the Bs played England. The Bs included Beldham, Beauclerk and E. H. Budd but, on this occasion, they had only nine players whose name began with B. Needing two more players, they were joined by John Wells and James Lawrell as given men. According to Haygarth, Lawrell could only have played for the Bs because he had backed them: "certainly not for his excellence as a cricketer, as in the case of Wells".

The Bs batted first and struggled to make 137. Beldham was bowled by William Lambert for 0. Beauclerk with 41 and Budd with 27 were the top scorers. England's batsmen also battled to score and Beldham held four catches as they were dismissed for 100. With a lead of 37 in very difficult conditions, the Bs were in a relatively good position and a second innings total of over 100 might have won the match. That did not happen because the Bs were all out for 6. Five of their runs were scored by Wells (4) and Lawrell (1); only one B, Samuel Bridger, scored a run, though John Bentley was the not out batsman. There were only three scoring shots because Wells hit a boundary. Beldham and Beauclerk were both bowled by John Hammond and Budd was absent injured. Hammond dismissed at least six of the nine batsmen who were out, including five bowled. There can have been no certainty that England would score the 44 runs needed to win, and they soon lost their first four wickets, but Robert Robinson scored 23 not out to see them through. The Bs total of 6 is sometimes referenced as the world record for the lowest innings total in important cricket, although the match was played long before the official commencement of important cricket and is not recognised by Wisden among others. It was the sixth and last time that Beldham was, as far as is known, dismissed for a pair.

=== End of career ===
The 1821 edition of Gentlemen v Players, at Lord's on 23–24 July, was Beldham's last recorded important match. He was then 55 years old and had a bizarre finale. The Gentlemen batted first and were all out for 60, Beldham taking one catch to dismiss the innings' top scorer Henry J. Lloyd for 22. The Players began well as openers John Sparks and John Thumwood equalled the Gentlemen's total without loss. Sparks had another partnership with Thomas Beagley and the score advanced to over 200. Sparks was sixth man out for 63 and Beagley was joined by Beldham, batting at number eight. Beagley completed the first century in the Gentlemen v Players series. Sometime on the 24th, the Players reached 278/6, a lead of 218 with four wickets in hand. Beagley was 113 not out, Beldham 23 not out. It was at this point that the Gentlemen, captained by Beauclerk, threw in the towel and left the field. As it happens, the match had been billed as the "Coronation Match" to celebrate the accession of George IV and, in the words of Derek Birley, "it was a suitably murky affair".

Beldham later recalled that he had been injured during the match and needed a runner while batting. He said the professionals disliked the fixture and called it a waste of their time. He may have finished with important matches, but there is strong anecdotal evidence that Beldham continued to play to a very advanced age, for in his Oxford Memories, Pycroft stated: "Beldham's was a green old age. Even when between sixty and seventy [1826–1836] he was barred in county matches".

== Style and technique ==
In The Cricketers of My Time, John Nyren eulogised Beldham's batting prowess:

...(he was) safer than the Bank; ...he would get at the balls and hit them away in gallant style. But when he could cut them at the point of his bat, he was in all his glory; and, upon my life, their speed was as the speed of thought; ...one of the most beautiful sights that can be imagined, and which would have delighted an artist, was to see him make himself up to hit a ball. It was the beau ideal (sic) of grace, animation, and concentrated energy.

Beldham is remembered primarily as a fine attacking batsman who was "an excellent judge of a short run, had a good knowledge of the game and was a very fine field". He was also highly effective as a change bowler, good enough to be termed a batting all-rounder. Using the standard underarm action and pitching the ball, his delivery was "high and well, pace moderate, yet bordering on the fast and getting up quick". Said to have been a "safe pair of hands" in the field, available evidence indicates that his preferred position was in the slips. Beldham has also been credited with many stumpings, although as the person catching the ball was credited with the stumping, this means he wasn't necessarily a wicket-keeper as we understand it today. His best known performance as a fielder was holding seven catches in a single match. He did this twice: for Kent v England in June 1792, and for MCC v Kent in June 1793.

Along with other greats such as John Small and Tom Walker, Beldham did much to lay the foundations of what can now be recognised as modern batting technique. He had a sound defence, like Small and Walker, but was also a fluent stroke maker like Small and the later Fuller Pilch. It is said that his brother-in-law John Wells impressed upon Beldham the importance of the high left elbow, although a Farnham gingerbread maker and coach, Harry Hall, has also been credited with this. This was a novelty at the time but has since become a standard part of technique for a right-handed batsman.

When he was interviewed by Pycroft, Beldham claimed that he, Fennex and Harry Walker had revolutionised batting by introducing the cut (Walker) and forward play (Beldham and Fennex). However, this is contradicted by Nyren who says that the earlier Hambledon batsman Tom Sueter was noted for his cut shot and probably invented forward play, being the first player known to leave his crease and play the drive.

Beldham was in his nineties when his photograph was taken (see infobox) and he is the earliest cricketer for whom a photograph exists. His legacy has lived on and he is still widely recognised as the outstanding batsman of the late 18th and early 19th centuries. In 1997, in an article in The Times, former Wisden editor John Woodcock named Beldham in his 100 Greatest Cricketers of All Time.

== Personality ==
Beldham was described by Nyren, who knew him personally, as "a close-set, active man, standing about five feet eight inches and a half". He was called "Silver Billy" because of his light-coloured hair and fair complexion.

Beldham was noted for his integrity and fair play. It was said of him that the only blot on his playing career was that he once biased a ball he bowled against Lord Frederick Beauclerk, during a single wicket match at Lords in June 1806, with a lump of mud and sawdust. It had the desired effect. During a period of the game's history when betting and match-fixing was rife, even Beldham was not immune to the lure of easy money. When interviewed by Pycroft in 1837, he said: "You may hear that I sold matches. I will confess I once was sold myself by two men, one of whom would not bowl, and the other would not bat, his best, and lost ten pounds. The next match, at Nottingham, I joined in selling, and got my money back. But for this once, I could say I never was bought in my life; and this was not for want of offers from C and other turfmen, though often I must have been accused. For where it was worth while to buy, no man could keep a character; because to be out without runs or to miss a catch was, by the disappointed betting-men, deemed proof as strong as Holy Writ".

== Family and personal life ==
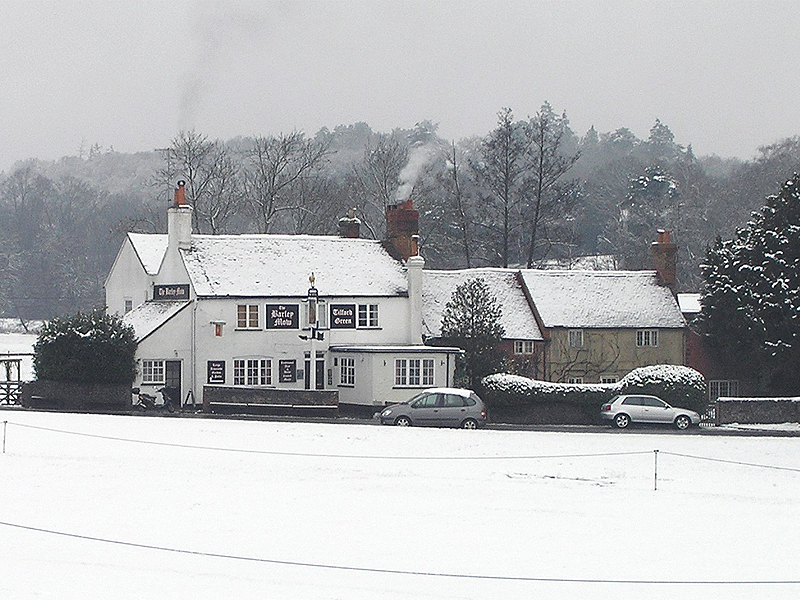
The Barley Mow pub, overlooking Tilford Green

Beldham retired to Tilford, where he was initially the landlord for some years of a public house, The Barley Mow, and spent his last 41 years there. He married twice. By his first wife Ann Smith (1765–1800) he had one daughter, also Ann, born (and died) 1800. His second wife, another Ann (1779–1869), bore him eight children between 1804 and 1819 and eventually outlived him by some seven years. Beldham and his second wife are buried in the Tilford churchyard, just up the road from the green: their graves are unmarked, but are thought to be in the north-west corner. Beldham's cottage still sits by the side of the pub, albeit with the later addition of an upper floor.

Beldham's sister Hannah (1786–1842) married another leading cricketer of the day, John Wells. As late as 1861, forty years after his last important game and while he was still living, a wall of The Cricketers pub in Wrecclesham still bore the legend "Rendezvous of those Famous Cricketers Beldham & Wells" (another version has the sign as "Good Beer as drunk by those Famous Men Beldham & Wells"). That an early landlord of this pub may well have been one of Beldham's brothers may have something to do with this early example of celebrity endorsement.

Beldham died at Tilford on 26 February 1862. His fame was not quickly forgotten after his playing career ended, for the July 1862 edition of London Society magazine reported that "Old Beldham died last winter (February) near Farnham, aged ninety-six. Not long before, the old man was invited to Lord's, and received with all honours in the pavilion: he was also advertised as expected at The Oval, to increase the attraction of a match between the old players and the young".

== Bibliography ==
- ACS (1981). A Guide to Important Cricket Matches Played in the British Isles 1709–1863. Nottingham: ACS. Archived from the original on 20 September 2022.
- ACS (1982). A Guide to First-class Cricket Matches Played in the British Isles. Nottingham: ACS.
- Altham, H. S.; Swanton, E. W. (1962). A History of Cricket, Volume 1 (to 1914) (5th ed.). London: George Allen & Unwin. OCLC 894274808.
- Ashley-Cooper, F. S. (1924). Hambledon Cricket Chronicle: 1772–1796. London: Jenkins. OCLC 38498574.
- Ashley-Cooper, F. S. (1981). "Old-time Champion of Surrey". In Hayter, Reg (ed.). The Best of "The Cricketer": 1921–1981. London: Cassell. ISBN 978-03-04307-00-5.
- Birley, Derek (1999). A Social History of English Cricket. London: Aurum Press. ISBN 978-18-54107-10-7 – via Internet Archive.
- Buckley, G. B. (1935). Fresh Light on 18th Century Cricket. Birmingham: Cotterell & Co. OCLC 23450280.
- Buckley, G. B. (1937). Fresh Light on pre-Victorian Cricket. Birmingham: Cotterell & Co. OCLC 23469107.
- Collyer, Graham (1982). Farnham Cricket Club Bi-Centenary 1782–1982. Farnham Castle Newspapers.
- Eagar, Desmond (1986). "The Hambledon Era: 1750–1787". In Swanton, E. W.; Plumptre, George; Woodcock, John (eds.). Barclays World of Cricket. London: HarperCollins. ISBN 978-00-02181-93-8.
- Haygarth, Arthur (1996) [1862]. Scores & Biographies, Volume 1 (1744–1826). Kennington: Frederick Lillywhite. ISBN 978-19-00592-23-9.
- Haygarth, Arthur (1997) [1862]. Scores & Biographies, Volume 2 (1827–1840). Kennington: Frederick Lillywhite. ISBN 978-19-00592-23-9.
- Lucas, E. V. (1952) [1907]. The Hambledon Men. London: Sportsman's Book Club. OCLC 500497384 – via Wikisource.
- Nyren, John (1998) [1832]. Mote, Ashley (ed.). The Cricketers of my Time. London: Robson Publishing. ISBN 978-18-61051-68-4.
- Pycroft, Rev. James (1854). The Cricket Field. London: Longman. OCLC 1480847561.
- Pycroft, Rev. James (1886). Oxford memories: a retrospect after fifty years. Vol. II. London: Richard Bentley & Sons. OCLC 835389794.
- Underdown, David (2000). Start of Play. Westminster: Allen Lane. ISBN 978-07-13993-30-1 – via Internet Archive.
- Waghorn, H. T. (1899). Cricket Scores, Notes, &c. From 1730–1773. Edinburgh: Blackwood. OCLC 1086375331.
- Waghorn, H. T. (2005) [1906]. The Dawn of Cricket. London: J. W. McKenzie. ISBN 978-09-47821-17-3.
- Warner, Pelham (1946). Lords: 1787–1945. London: Harrap. OCLC 877106024.
- Webber, Roy (1951). The Playfair Book of Cricket Records. London: Playfair Books Ltd. OCLC 753176177.
- Wilde, Simon (1998). Number One: The World's Best Batsmen and Bowlers. London: Gollancz. ISBN 978-05-75064-53-9.
