= Henry Lloyd =

Henry Lloyd may refer to:

- Henry Lloyd (governor) (1852–1920), governor of Maryland
- Henry Lloyd (soldier) (c. 1718–1783), Welsh army officer and military writer
- Henry Demarest Lloyd (1847–1903), American journalist
- Henry J. Lloyd (1794–1853), English amateur cricketer
- Henry Lloyd (priest) (1911–2001), English Anglican priest

== See also ==
- Henri Lloyd, clothing retailer
- John Henry Lloyd (1884–1964), Negro league baseball player
