= John Wells (cricketer) =

English cricketer

John Wells (5 January 1760, in Wrecclesham, Surrey – 15 February 1835, in Wrecclesham) was a famous English cricketer who played for Surrey.

== Career ==
Wells was an all-rounder who batted right-handed. He was a fast underarm bowler but it is not known if he bowled right or left-handed.

Wells made his debut in the 1787 English cricket season when he played for England against White Conduit Club in one of the earliest matches at Lord's Old Ground, which had just opened that season. He played until 1815.

Wells played for the Players in the second Gentlemen v Players match in 1806.

== Family ==
His brother James Wells, an occasional player, also represented Surrey. John married Hannah Beldham, the sister of Billy Beldham.

== External sources ==
- CricketArchive
