= Thomas Lord Jr =

English cricketer

Personal information
- Full name: Thomas Lord
- Born: 1794
- Died: 1875 (aged 80–81); Westminster, London
- Relatives: Thomas Lord (father)

Domestic team information
- Years: Team
- 1815–1816: Middlesex

Thomas Lord Jr (c. 1794 – c. 1875), was an English cricketer who played from 1815 to 1816. Mainly associated with Middlesex, he made five known appearances. He was the son of Thomas Lord, founder of Lord's Cricket Ground.

== Early life ==
Lord was born in 1794 and christened on 27 December 1794 at Marylebone. He died in 1875 at Westminster, London.
