= George Beldham =

English cricket team

George Beldham (born 1758 and christened 17 May 1758 in Wrecclesham, Surrey) was an English professional cricketer who made three known appearances in historically important matches from 1800 to 1805. He was the elder brother of Billy Beldham, and he played for Surrey.
