= Farnham Pottery =

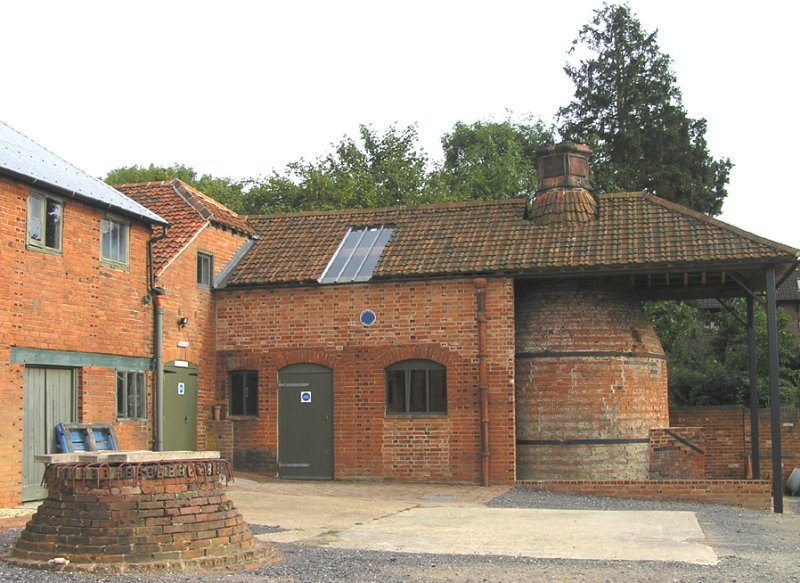
- The Bottle kiln

- Location within Surrey
- 51°11′42″N 0°49′14″W
- Type: Pottery
- OS grid reference: SU 82520 44636

Site notes
- Architectural style: Victorian
- Owner: Farnham Buildings Preservation Trust

Listed Building – Grade II
- Official name: The Farnham Pottery, including the pottery workshops, kiln, water cistern, entrance block, toilet block, former forge, messroom and garage
- Designated: 27 May 1999
- Reference no.: 1387288

Farnham Pottery is located in Wrecclesham near Farnham, Surrey. This is one of the best preserved examples of a working Victorian country pottery left in England and is a grade II listed building. Its significance in the local area is shown by it featuring on the emblem of Wrecclesham Cricket Club.

== History ==
A major pottery industry has existed in the Farnham area since Roman times and in the 16th century supplied London with a substantial part of its pottery requirements. In the Middle Ages, Farnham clay was shipped by river to Kingston upon Thames and surrounding villages, where it was potted; collectively this is known as "Surrey whiteware". A letter in 1594 mentions that white clay was dug in Farnham Park to make drinking vessels used by lawyers at the Inner Temple in London. At its height, the pottery operated its own clay pits, had four working kilns and employed up to thirty men. A lightweight tramway connected the pits to the pottery, with tubs being pushed along the temporary tracks.

In 1872 it was owned by Absalom Harris. The early work was utility wares including drainpipes and tiles. Around 1880, he was asked to copy a French vase. After many trials, Harris managed to produce a reasonable example using a lead glaze made green by the addition of copper oxide.

After that, the production of art pottery featured more prominently in the company's agenda, and Farnham Greenware, as it was known, established itself. A strong connection with Farnham School of Art was formed.

W. H. Allen designed for Farnham Pottery from the turn of the century until 1943. The pots were sold at Heals and Liberty. The company was widely known for its 'owl jugs' which were produced up to the 1950s.

The pottery is now no longer owned by the Harris family. Farnham Buildings Preservation Trust (FBPT) bought the site in 1998 and they have their own group of potters (West Street Potters) producing pottery there. The pottery still contains many examples of the original moulds and a number of local houses were built using architectural fittings made on this site.

== Gallery ==
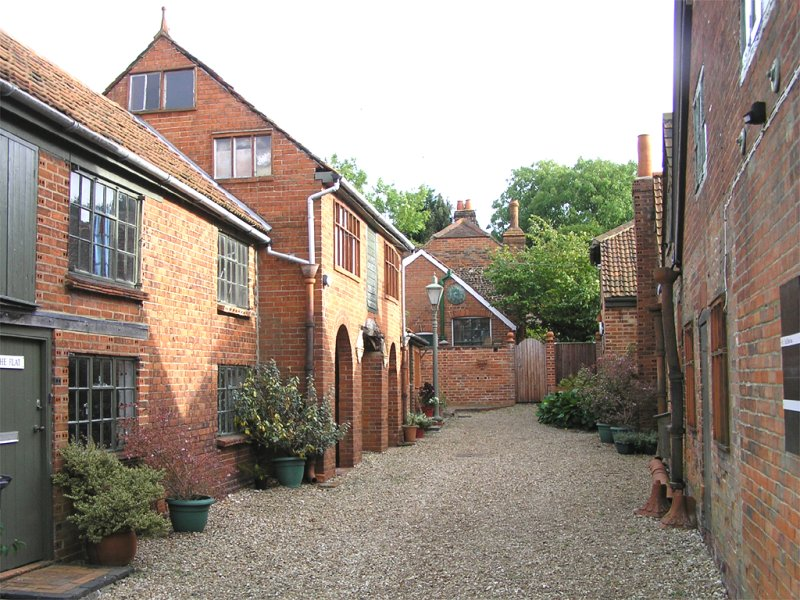
Farnham Pottery yard

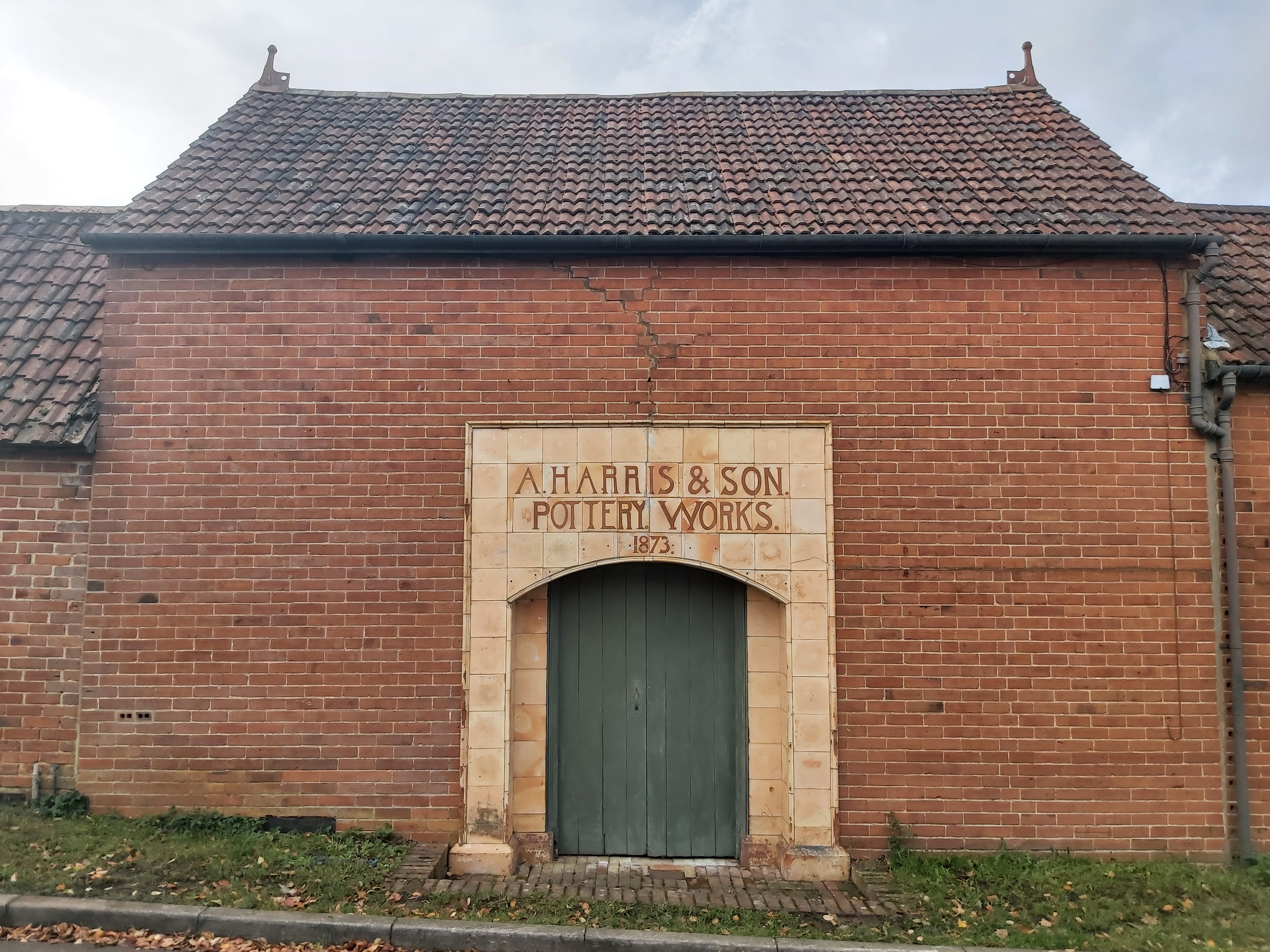
Back entrance, showing "A. Harris & Son, Pottery Works, 1873"

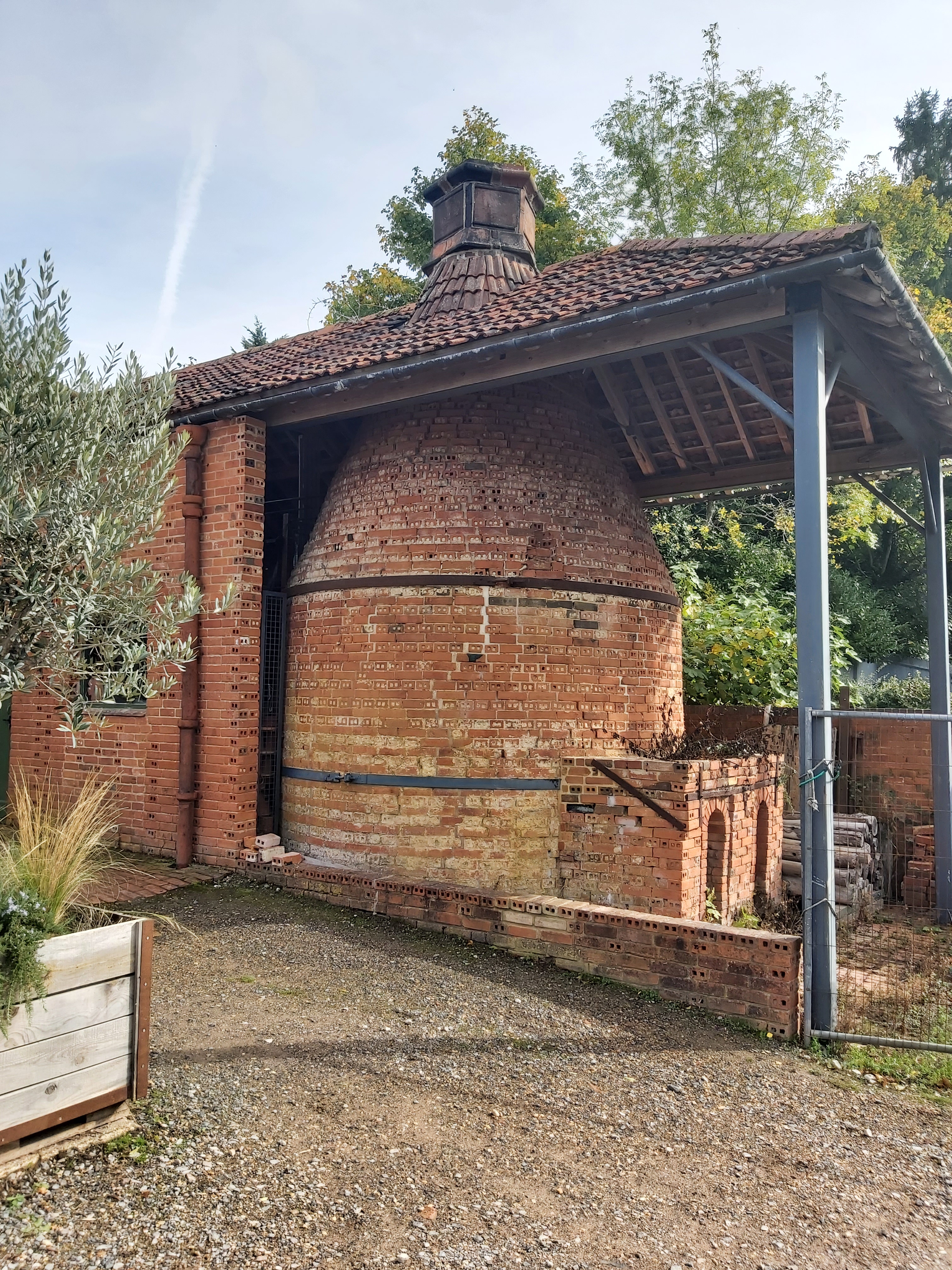
The bottle kiln

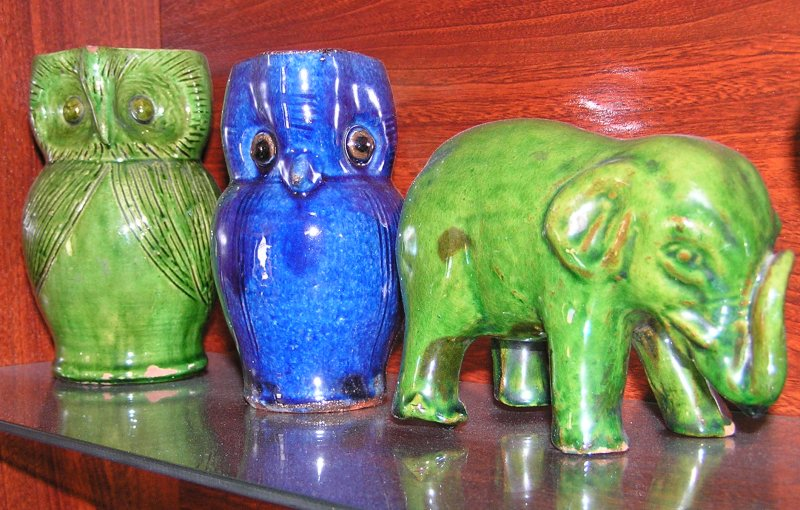
Examples of typical Farnham Pottery wares from the early 20th century
