= St Peter's Church, Wrecclesham =

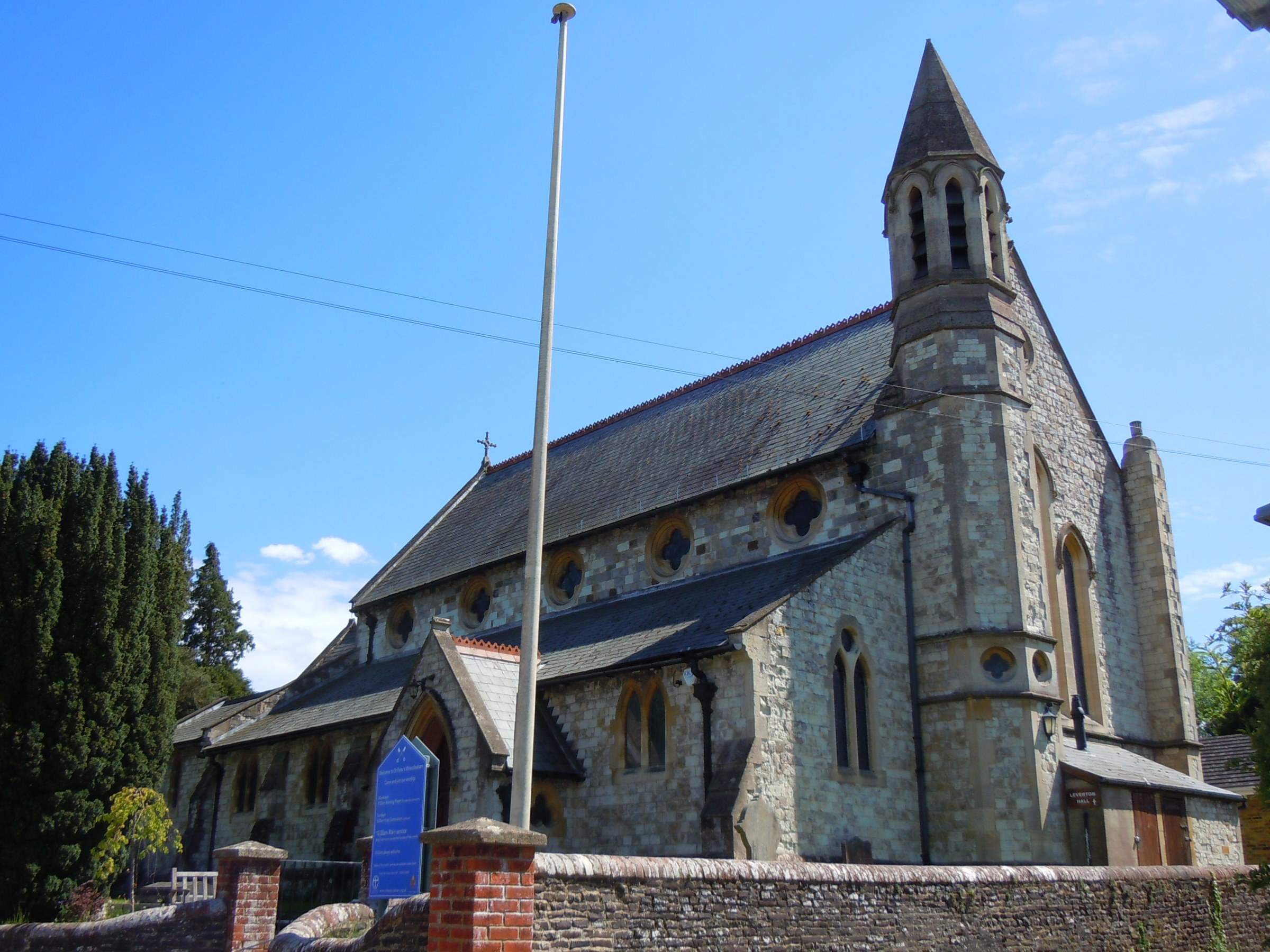
- View of church from School Hill

- Location in Surrey
- 51°11′53″N 0°49′04″W
- OS grid reference: SU 82698 44977
- Location: Wrecclesham, Surrey
- Country: England
- Denomination: Anglican
- Website: CofEWrecclesham.org.uk

History
- Status: Active
- Founder: Bishop Charles Sumner
- Dedication: Saint Peter
- Consecrated: 16 July 1840

Architecture
- Functional status: Parish church
- Heritage designation: Grade II
- Designated: 29 December 1972
- Architect: James Harding

Administration
- Province: Canterbury
- Diocese: Guildford
- Archdeaconry: Surrey
- Deanery: Farnham

St Peter's Church is an active Anglican Parish church in Wrecclesham, a village outside Farnham in Surrey. It is in the deanery of Farnham, the archdeaconry of Surrey and the Diocese of Guildford. The church was consecrated in 1840 and is a Grade II listed building.

== History ==
=== Church ===
In 1820 Wrecclesham was seen as a village of not having the best of reputations. The situation so disgusted an Australian who had come to live in Farnham that he wrote to a publication, The Speaker, as follows:

There is one licence to every 126 inhabitants (in Farnham), with the result that during the eight months I have been in the district I have seen more drunk people than during the previous 12 years in Adelaide, with a population more than ten times as large. It is very necessary that something be done to lessen the evil, which is even worse in the surrounding villages. About two miles from here is a village called Wreekelsham (sic), with a population of 600, and in its main street there are five licensed houses within 200 yards, besides another in a side street, and several grocer's licences. On Monday afternoons the whole village is drunk, and one has to drive through it very carefully.

The Bishop of Winchester, who lived at the nearby Farnham Castle, after hearing about Wrecclesham, decided to build a church to 'bring the worship of God into the village'. A collection to fund the church was begun and after raising £1000 the building work started. The new church was consecrated on 16 July 1840 by the Bishop of Winchester, Charles Sumner. It was a small building consisting of a chancel, nave and north transept. The first vicar of the parish was Rev. R. D. Buttermer, who has a street in Wrecclesham named after him, Buttermer Close.

Over the next few decades the size of the church steadily increased. In 1861, the church was enlarged with the chancel rebuilt and the south aisle added. In 1876, the nave was rebuilt with the north aisle added.

In 1890, Rev. Charles Keable (d. 1923) became vicar of the parish. He served the parish for 33 years and after his death a street in Wrecclesham was also named after him, Keable Road.

The organ was originally from St James' Church, formerly in east Farnham. It was moved to St Peter's in 1975, when St James' was converted into apartments. A new organ was bought in 1996 to replace that one and was installed in June 2001.

=== Parish ===
The attempt to improve the social welfare of the village did not stop at only building the church. Beginning from the church, various other buildings and works were started. In 1860, St. Peter's School was opened. From the school, the Wrecclesham choir was created. The Wrecclesham Institute was made soon afterwards. It is opposite the church on the other side of School Hill. The institute was a licensed establishment that also created many sports and social organisations for the local population and was a founding team of Wrecclesham Cricket Club. Also, the Knights Almshouse was built down the hill from the church, along the Street, Wrecclesham.

The parish hall, which is next door to the church, is named Leverton Hall after Rev. Charles Leverton (d. 1973), and was added in the early 1970s when the village hall was demolished.

== Gallery ==
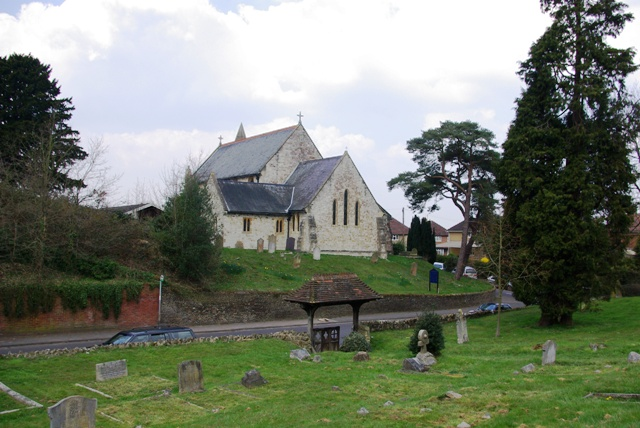
The church hall is to the left of the church

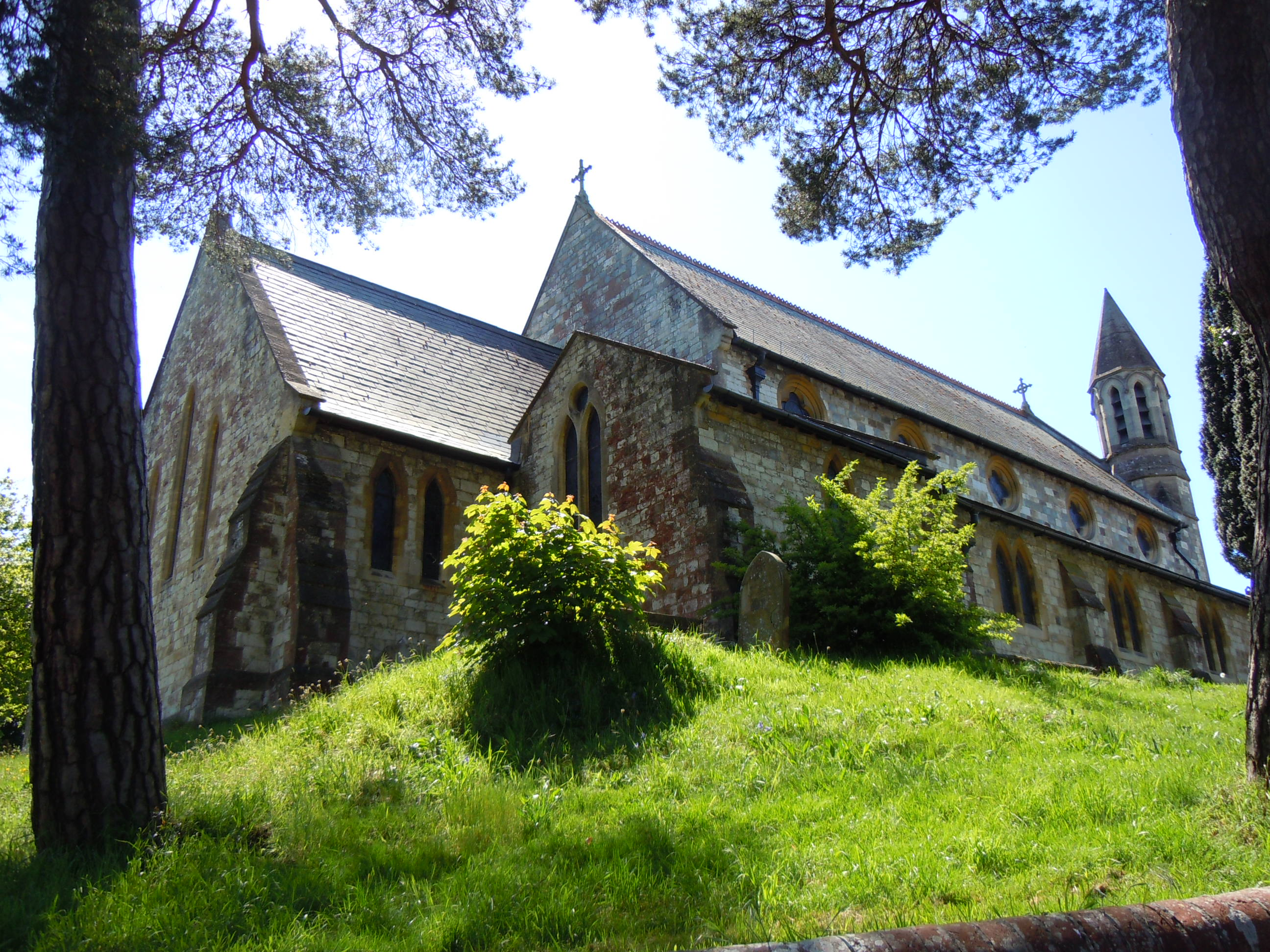
North side of the church, as seen from School Hill

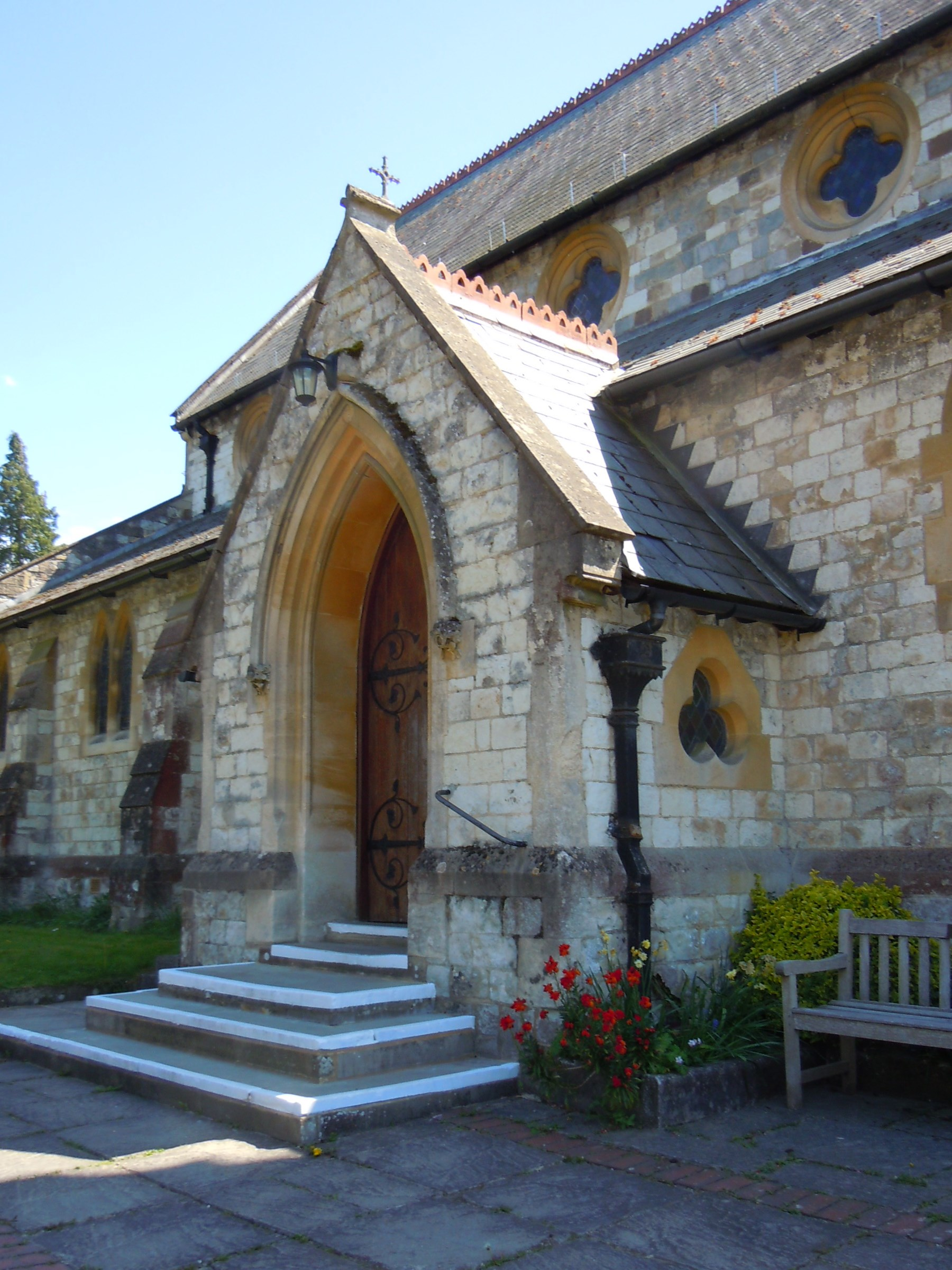
Entrance from Beale Lane

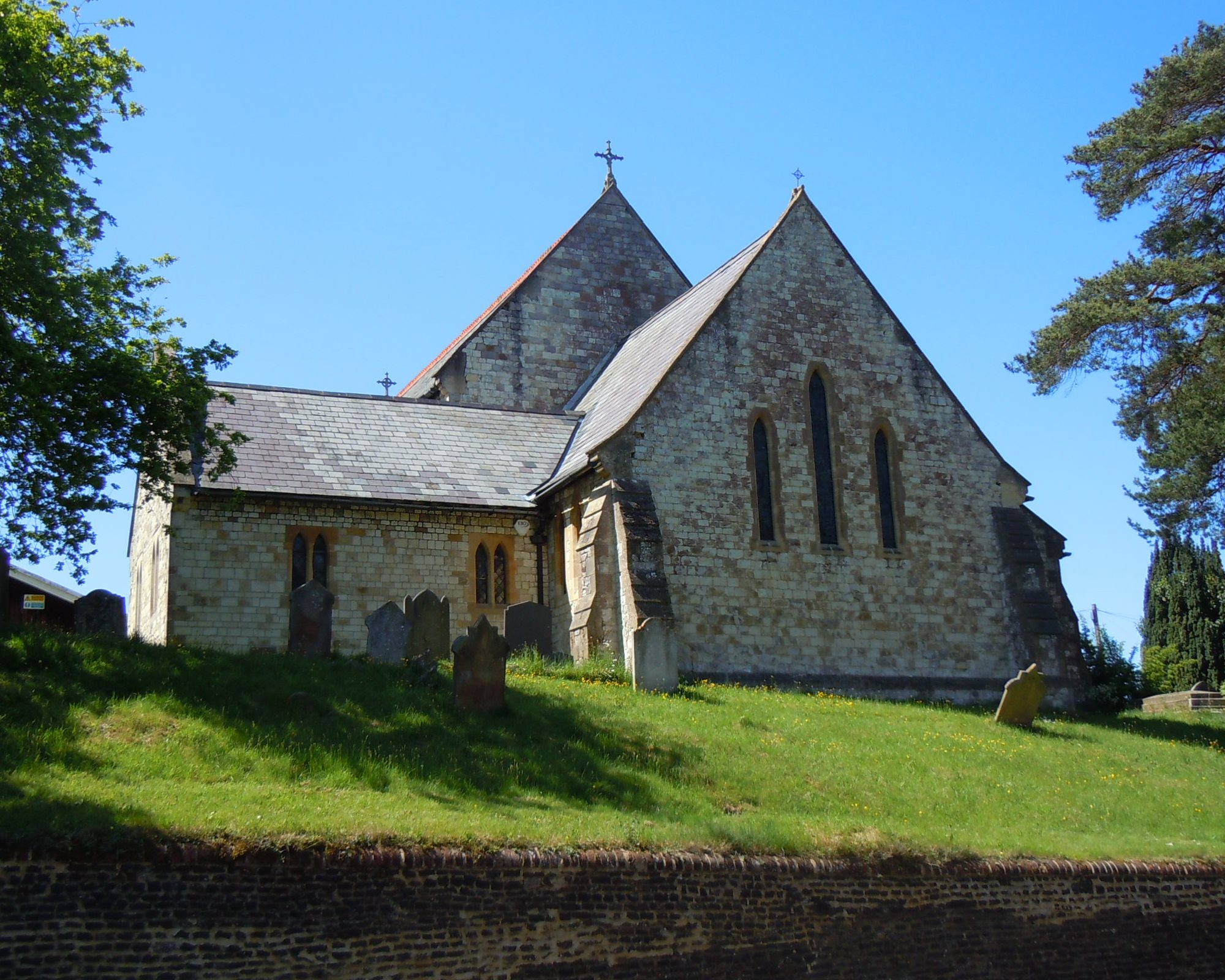
East side of the church

== See also ==
- Wrecclesham
