= 1821 English cricket season =

Cricket season review

The 1821 English cricket season was the 35th since the foundation of Marylebone Cricket Club (MCC). The Gentlemen v Players match was ended in controversial circumstances. Details of five historically important eleven-a-side matches are known. (Note: Any match listed in the ACS' Important Match Guide (1981) is historically important, and therefore of the highest standard, whether or not a scorecard might exist. The same applies to numerous matches discovered by researchers since 1981. For further information, see First-class cricket.)

== Events ==
- In the Gentlemen v Players match at Lord's Cricket Ground, the Gentlemen conceded the game having gone well behind on 1st innings. Derek Birley commented that it was a "Coronation Match" to celebrate the accession of King George IV and was "a suitably murky affair".
- With cricket still recovering from the effects of the Napoleonic War, only a few matches were recorded in 1821:
  - 24 May – Cambridge University v Cambridge Town Club @ University Ground, Cambridge
  - 3 July – Marylebone Cricket Club (MCC) v Godalming @ Lord's Cricket Ground
  - 9 July – Godalming v MCC @ The Burys, Godalming
  - 16–18 July – MCC v Hampshire @ Lord's Cricket Ground
  - 23–24 July – Gentlemen v Players @ Lord's Cricket Ground
- The Gentlemen v Players match marked the final first class appearance of Billy Beldham in a career lasting from 1787.

== Bibliography ==
- ACS (1981). A Guide to Important Cricket Matches Played in the British Isles 1709–1863. Nottingham: ACS. OCLC 85045528.
- Haygarth, Arthur (1996) [1862]. Scores & Biographies, Volume 1 (1744–1826). Kennington: Frederick Lillywhite. ISBN 978-19-00592-23-9.
- Warner, Pelham (1946). Lords: 1787–1945. London: Harrap. OCLC 877106024.
