= Thomas Duer Broughton =

English writer on India 1778–1835

Thomas Duer Broughton (1778–1835) was an English soldier and writer on India.

== Life and writings ==
Thomas Duer Broughton, son of the Rev. Thomas Broughton, Rector of St Peter's Church, Castle Park, Bristol, was educated at Eton, and went to India in 1795 as a cadet in the East India Company's Bengal Army. He became a lieutenant in 1797 and fought at the siege of Seringapatam in 1799. He was later appointed adjutant and assistant teacher of Hindi to the Cadet company at Barasett.(described in his obituary in the United Services Magazine as " a sort of college formed to receive the cadets, and teach and discipline them on their first arrival in the country")

In 1802 Broughton was appointed military resident with the Mahrattas. He published his experiences in a book entitled Letters Written in a Mahratta Camp During the Year 1809, descriptive of the character, manners, domestic habits, and religious ceremonies of the Mahrattas (1813). During this period he also collected Hindi poems from oral tradition, publishing his transcriptions and translations as Selections from the Popular Poetry of the Hindoos (1814). He left for England at the end of 1811 and returned to India in August 1815, having been promoted to the rank of major. He was then appointed to the command of Weltevreden on Java, but by the time he arrived on the island in April 1816, preparations were being made to hand it back to the Dutch, and so he was returned to Bengal. In 1822 he was promoted to the rank of lieutenant-colonel.

On his return from India he became honorary secretary of the Royal Asiatic Society, and travelled widely in Britain and southern Europe. He also published Edward and Laura, a free translation of a French novel by a follower of Rousseau, and translations of Persian poetry.

Thomas Duer Broughton died in Dorset Square, London, on 16 November 1835.
