= Thomas Lord =

English cricketer (1755–1832)

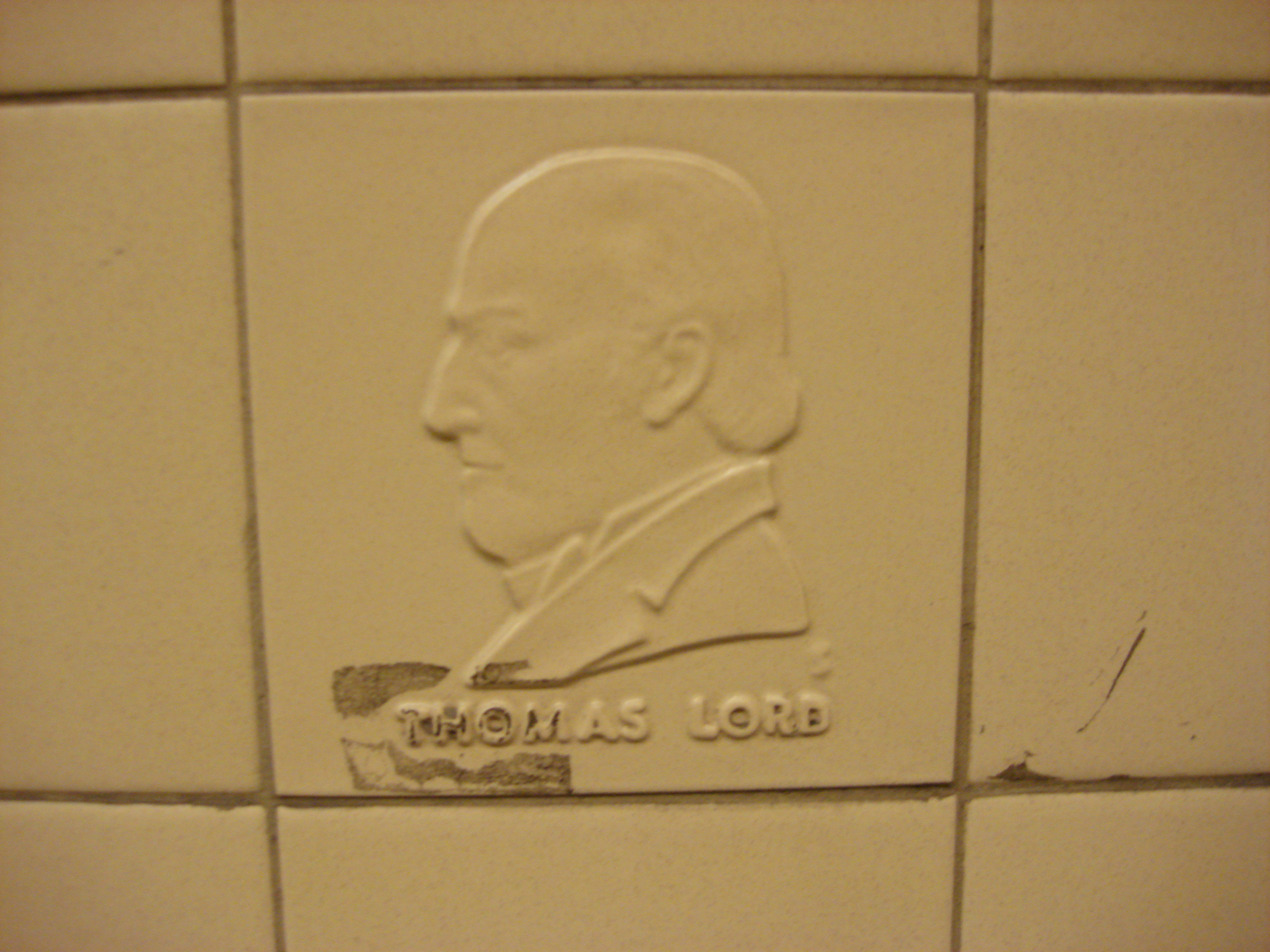
A tile with Thomas Lord's profile in relief at St John's Wood tube station.

Thomas Lord (23 November 1755 – 13 January 1832) was an English professional cricketer who played in historically important matches from 1787 to 1802, with a brief comeback in 1815. He is remembered for the foundation of Lord's, the eponymous cricket ground.

Overall, Lord made 90 known appearances in important matches. He was mostly associated with Middlesex, and with Marylebone Cricket Club (MCC) as a ground staff bowler.

== Early life ==
Lord was born in Thirsk, Yorkshire, in what became the town museum. His father was a Roman Catholic yeoman, who had his lands sequestered for supporting the Jacobite rising in 1745. Afterwards he worked as a labourer. The Lord family later moved to Diss, Norfolk, where Thomas Lord grew up. Following childhood, Lord moved to London and worked job as a bowler and general attendant at the White Conduit Club in Islington.

== Career ==
Lord began playing about 1780. His first recorded game was on 31 May 1787 on his "own ground", later Lord's Old Ground, and then Dorset Square. He played for Middlesex against Essex. Lord was not celebrated as a player but the match records of the 1790s indicate that he was a good bowler, although his opposition was not always of the highest standard.

In 1786 Thomas Lord was approached by George Finch, 9th Earl of Winchilsea, and Charles Lennox, 4th Duke of Richmond, the leading members of the White Conduit Club. They wanted Lord to find a more private venue for their club and offered him a guarantee against any losses he might suffer. In May 1787, Lord acquired seven acres (28,000 m^{2}) off Dorset Square and started his first ground. White Conduit relocated there and soon afterwards formed, or merged into, the new Marylebone Cricket Club (MCC).

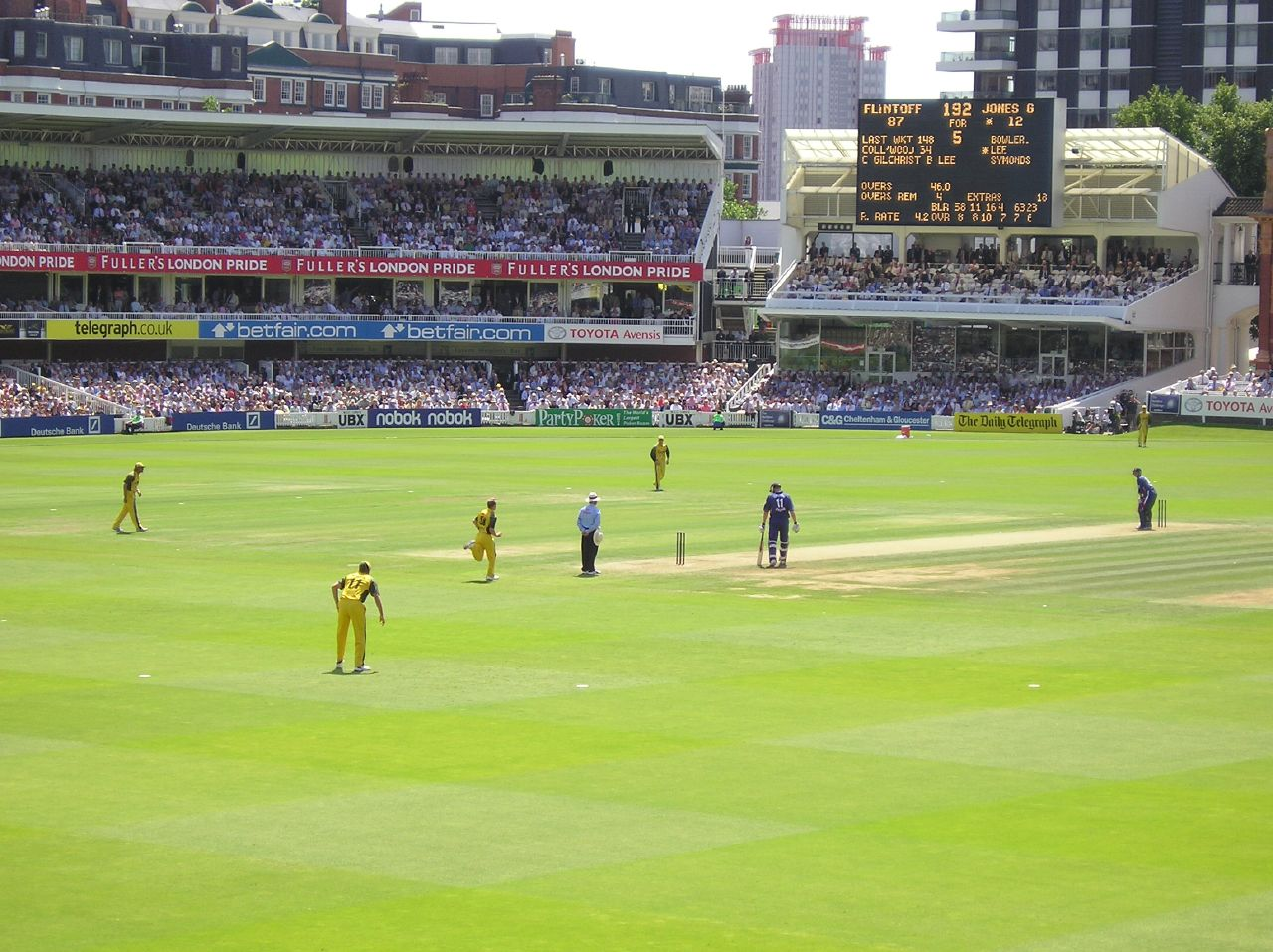
The Tavern Stand at Lord's Cricket Ground as it looks today.

The lease on the first ground ended in 1810 and Lord obtained an eighty-year lease on two fields, the Brick and Great Fields at North Bank, St John's Wood. The second venue, Lord's Middle Ground, was built by 1809 when the first games were played there by St John's Wood Cricket Club. This was later merged into MCC, who relocated to the Middle Ground in 1811. In 1813 Parliament requisitioned the land for the Regent's Canal, which cut through the site.

Lord then moved his ground to its present site in St John's Wood, literally taking his turf with him. It opened in 1814. Lord was not, however, making enough money and therefore obtained permission to develop part of the ground for housing, a move which left only 150 square yards of playing area. To counter his plan, Lord was bought out for £5,000 by MCC member William Ward, a noted batsman who was also a director of the Bank of England. Despite the change of ownership, the ground has retained Lord's name.

== Retirement and death ==
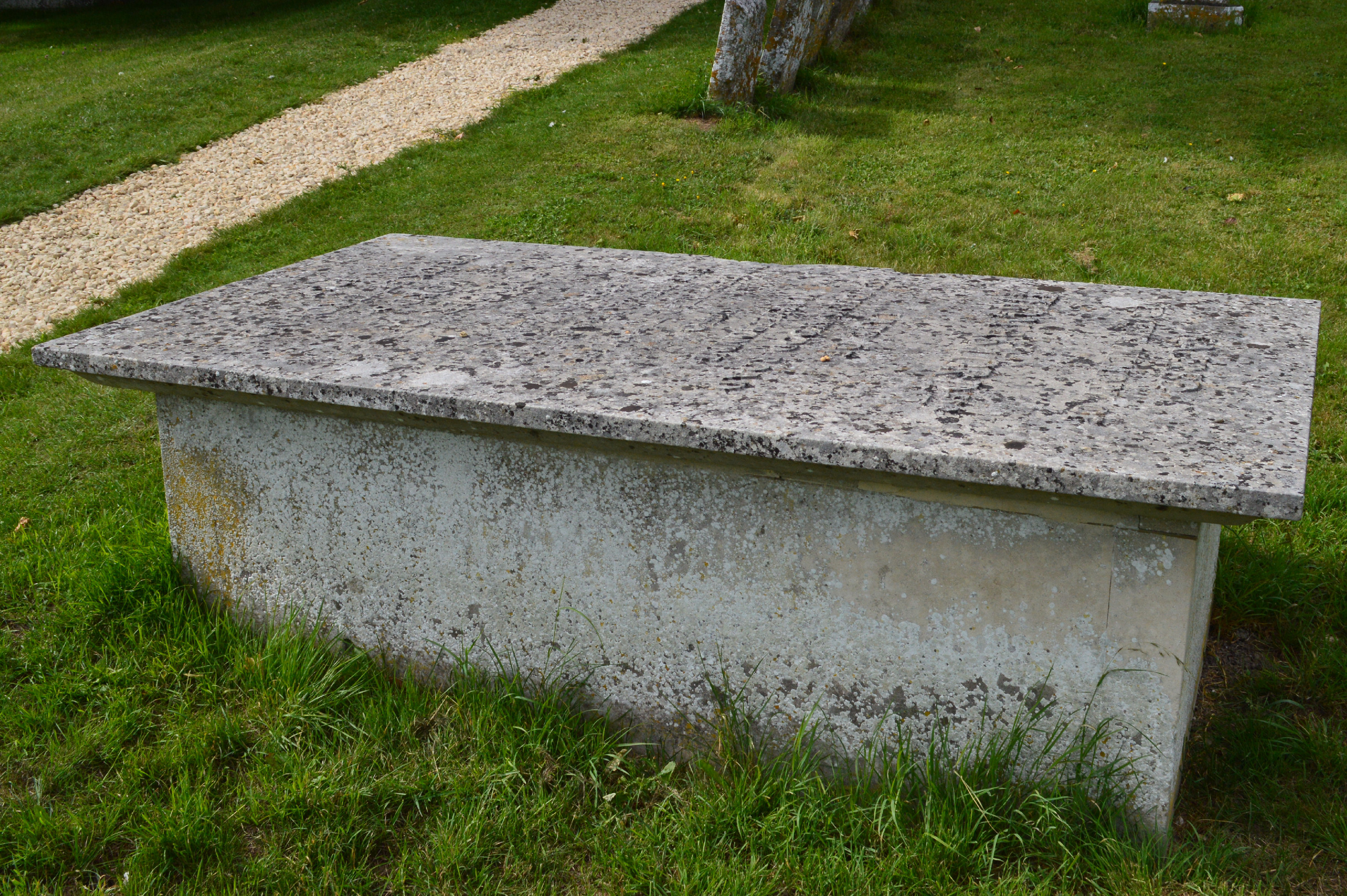
Lord's tomb in the churchyard of St John the Evangelist, West Meon

Lord remained in St John's Wood till 1830 when he retired to West Meon in Hampshire, where he died in 1832. His son, Thomas Lord Jr, born in Marylebone on 27 December 1794, was also a top-class cricketer.

Thomas Lord is buried in the churchyard of St John's Church at West Meon. The village has a public house named after him.
