= Dorset Square =

Garden square in Marylebone, London

Coordinates: 51.5228°N 0.1610°W

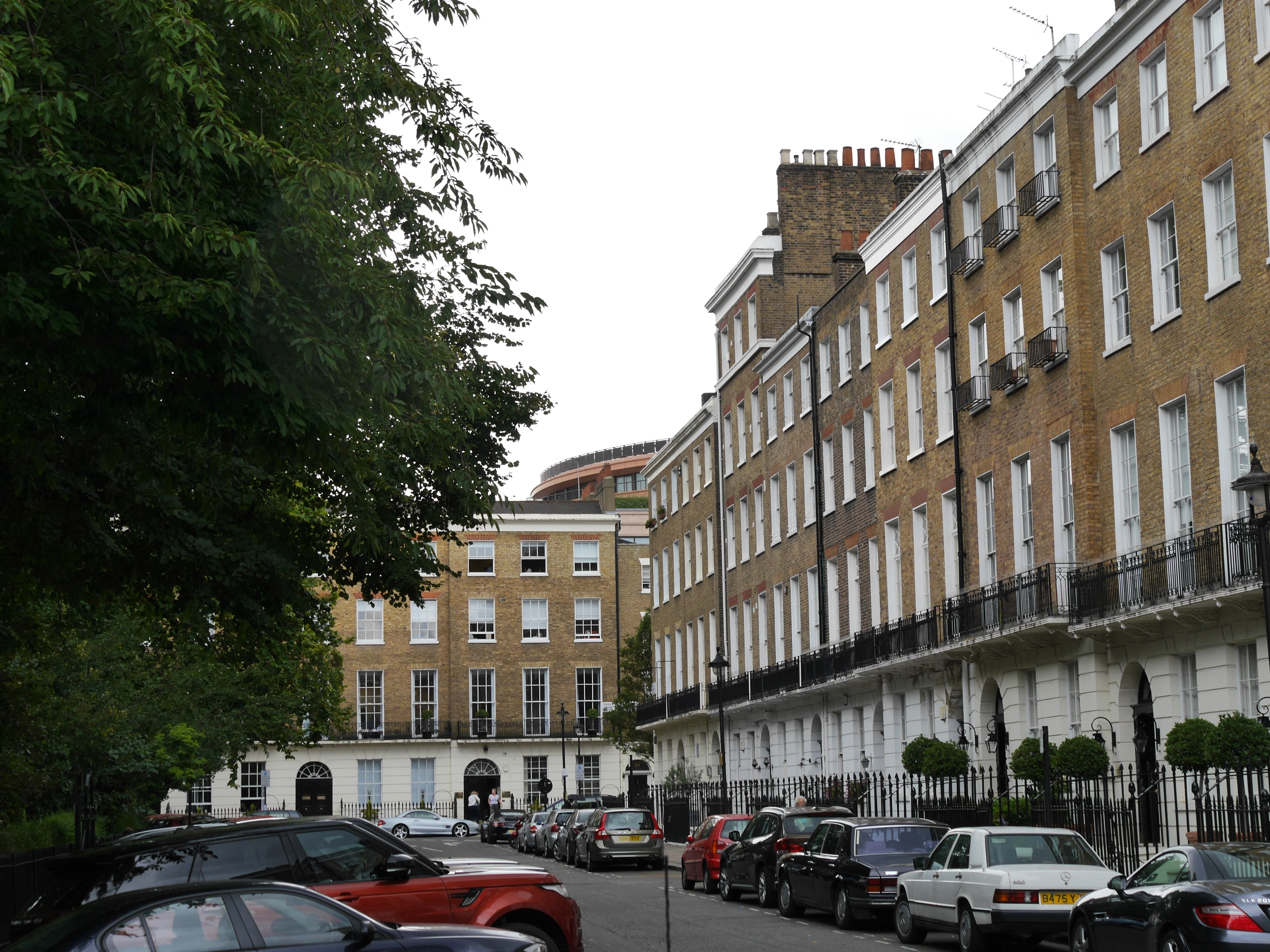
Dorset Square

Dorset Square is a garden square in Marylebone, London. All buildings fronting it are terraced houses and listed, in the mainstream (initial) category. It takes up the site of Lord's (MCC's) Old Cricket Ground, which lasted 23 years until the 1811 season. Internally it spans 100,000 square feet (9,290 m^{2}).

== Location ==
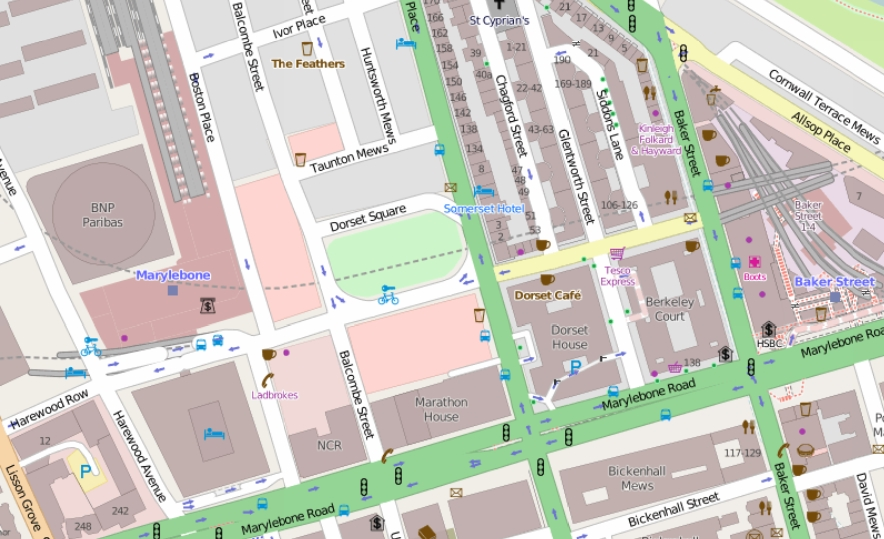
The immediate vicinity of Dorset Square.

A map showing the Dorset Square ward of St Marylebone Metropolitan Borough as it appeared in 1916.

== Approach ways ==
It is one 84-metre (276 ft., approx.) block north of Marylebone Road and lends its name to the roads on all four sides, in typical fashion — the east side forms a pause in the numbering and scope of Gloucester Place; the west does so as to Balcombe Street. The south side links:

- to the west Melcombe Place which behind the square's largest house/building (No.s 26 to 28, known as 28) to the west fronts the ticket hall (with food, drink and supermarket outlets) of Marylebone station (formerly Harewood Square) and the Landmark Hotel.
- to the east Melcombe Street (formerly New Street) which ends two main blocks away at Baker Street.

=== Site history ===
Dorset Square takes up (1787-founded) Lord's Old Ground the closure of which at the end of 1810's season was brought about by a sought rent increase.

== Buildings ==
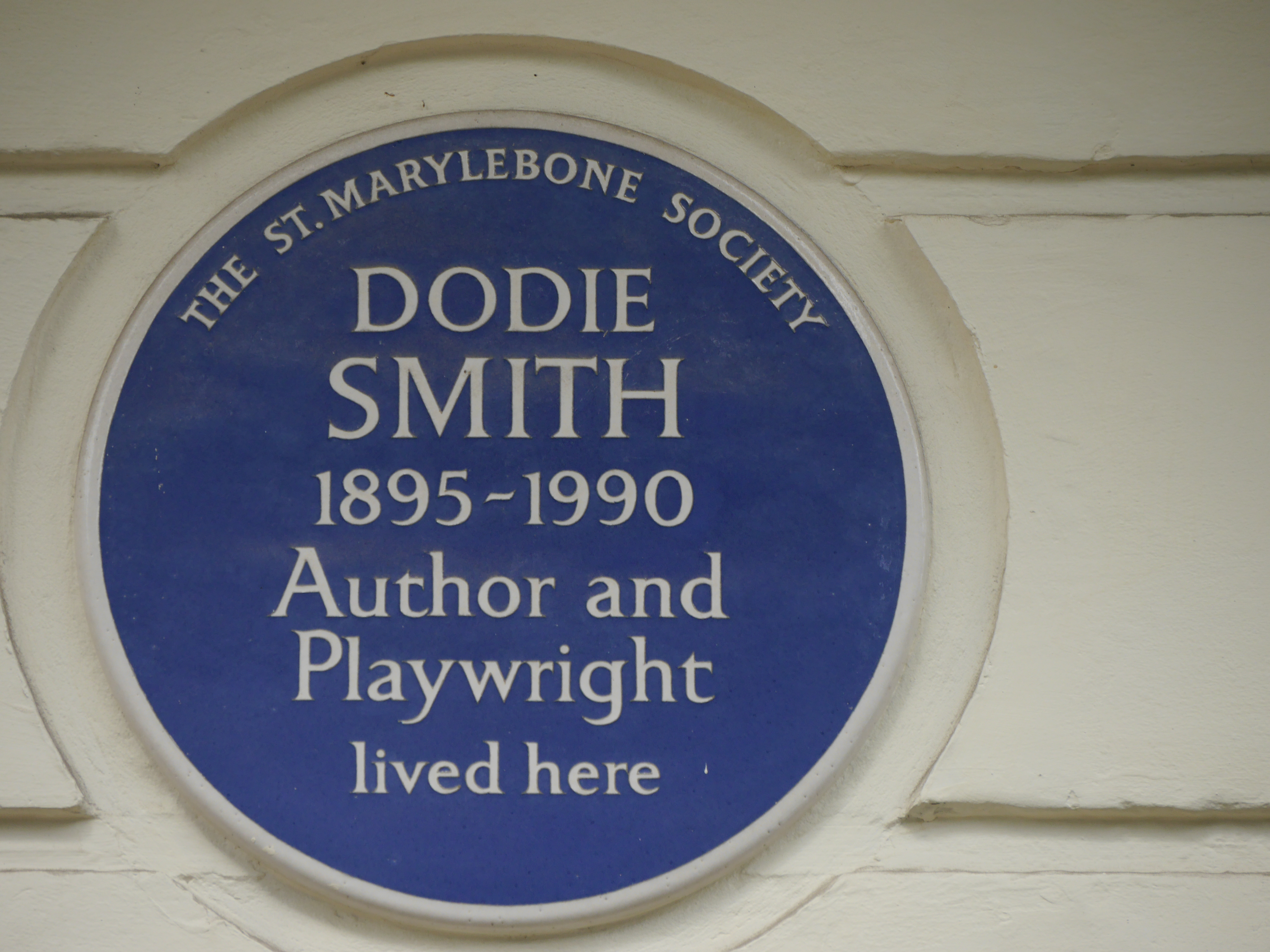
Dodie Smith blue plaque, 18 Dorset Square

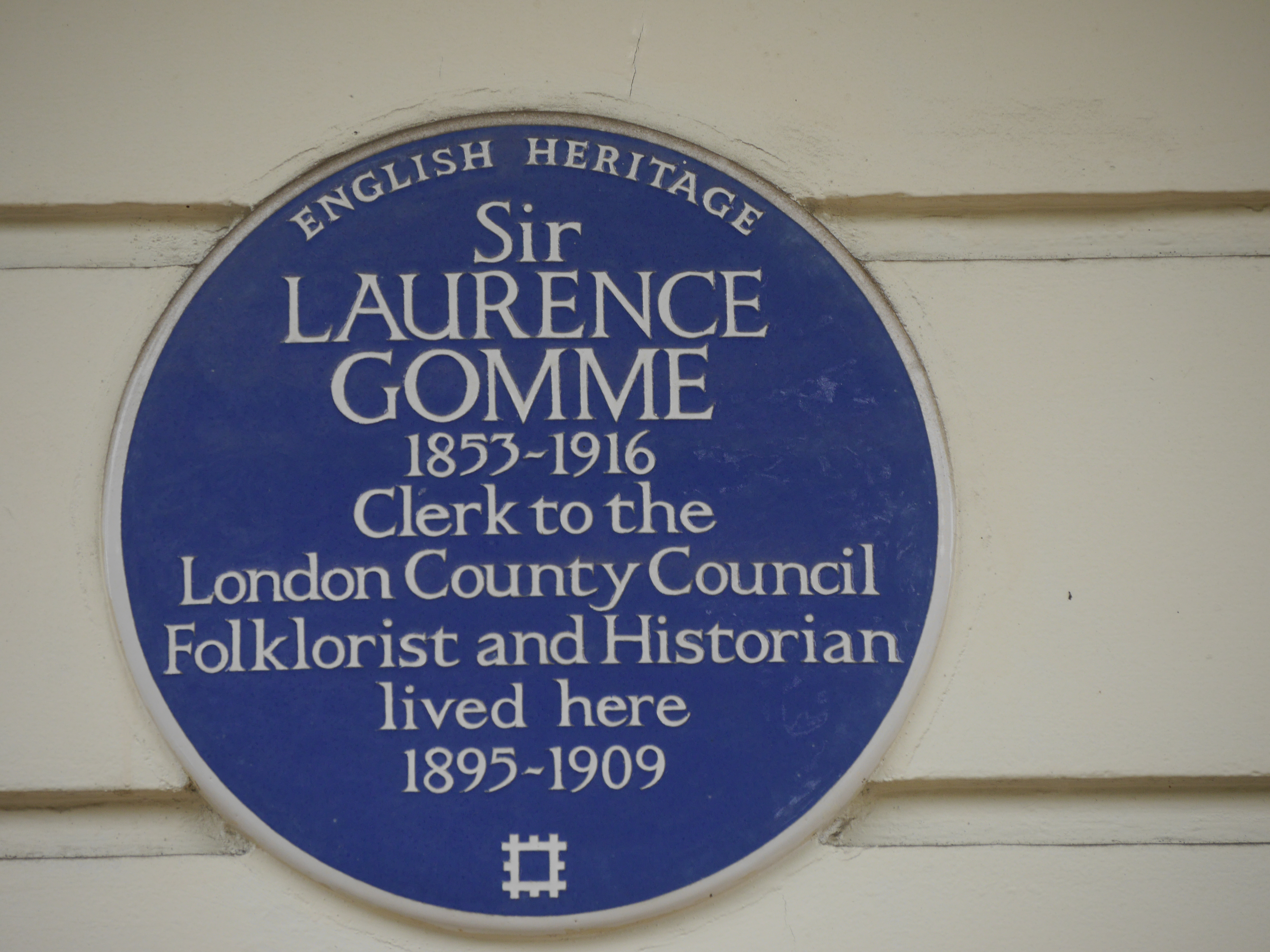
Laurence Gomme blue plaque, 24 Dorset Square

The buildings are 250 feet (76 m) or 400 feet (120 m) apart (north-to-south, east-to-west).

Dorset Square Hotel, created in 1985, can be found on the south side of the square, at 39-40 Dorset Square

All sides (east, No.s1-8; north No.s9-20; west No.s21-28; south No.s29-40) are Grade II listed buildings. The Embassy of El Salvador is at No. 8. No. 1 currently houses the London branch of Alliance Française but during WWII functioned as its international headquarters when the original in Paris was closed. A plaque by the front door commemorates the building's history as the site from which agents of the French Resistance were equipped for, and dispatched to, undercover missions in Occupied France.

== Notable residents ==
In birth order:

- George Saxby Penfold (1770–1846), a popular preacher, lived at No. 15
- Robert Fellowes (1771–1847), cleric, journalist and philanthropist
- Thomas Duer Broughton (1778–1835), army officer and writer on India
- Jeanette Pickersgill (c1814-1885), the first person to be legally cremated in the UK
- George Grossmith (1847–1912), comedian, writer, composer, actor, and singer (No. 28)
- Bithia Mary Croker (c. 1848–1920), Irish-born novelist, died at No. 30.
- Sir Laurence Gomme (1853–1916), folklorist (No. 24)
- Dodie Smith (1896–1990), novelist and playwright (No. 18)
- Jane Ridley (born 1953), historian, biographer and broadcaster (No. 31)
