= Thomas Clark (cricketer) =

English cricketer

Thomas Clark (dates unknown) was an English amateur cricketer who made seven known appearances in important matches between 1787 and 1791, one for Essex and six for Hornchurch Cricket Club.

== Bibliography ==
- Haygarth, Arthur (1996) [1862]. Scores & Biographies, Volume 1 (1744–1826). Kennington: Frederick Lillywhite. ISBN 978-19-00592-23-9.
- Haygarth, Arthur (1997) [1862]. Scores & Biographies, Volume 2 (1827–1840). Kennington: Frederick Lillywhite. ISBN 978-19-00592-23-9.
