= John Pilcher =

English cricketer

John Pilcher (1766 – 16 March 1838 at Canterbury, Kent) was an English cricketer who played for Kent.

He is believed to have been a right-handed player and was primarily a bowler of the underarm type but his pace has not been recorded. Like many east Kent players, he made several appearances for teams sponsored by Sir Horatio Mann.

He has a short entry in Scores and Biographies which states that he was a shoemaker by trade and resided mostly at Littlebourne, near Canterbury. In his later years he lived in the city of Canterbury itself and was buried in Westgate cemetery.

Pilcher's career spanned the 1787 to 1796 seasons and he made 32 known appearances in major matches.
