= James Wells (cricketer) =

English cricketer

Personal information
- Born: c. 8 February 1758
- Died: c. 30 December 1807
- Relatives: John Wells (brother)

Domestic team information
- Years: Team
- 1783–1789: Hampshire
- 1788–1800: Surrey

James Wells (1758–1807) was an English cricketer. Wells was the brother of cricketer John Wells.

Wells made his debut for a team representing Hampshire against an early England team. Wells played seven times for Hampshire as well as ten times for Surrey. His final match for Surrey came in 1800 against England. Wells also played a single important match for a team representing Kent in 1793, against the Marylebone Cricket Club. In addition to playing cricket for the above teams, he also represented Hampshire and Sussex, TA Smith's XI, N to Z and England.

== Bibliography ==
- Arthur Haygarth, Scores & Biographies, Volume 1 (1744–1826), Lillywhite, 1862
