= Wrecclesham =

Village and parish in Surrey, England

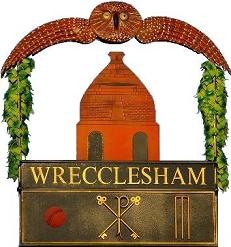
- Wrecclesham village sign

- Location within Surrey
- Population: 3,079
- OS grid reference: SU826449
- Civil parish: Farnham
- District: Waverley
- Shire county: Surrey
- Region: South East
- Country: England
- Sovereign state: United Kingdom
- Post town: Farnham
- Postcode district: GU10
- Dialling code: 01252
- Police: Surrey
- Fire: Surrey
- Ambulance: South East Coast
- UK Parliament: Farnham and Bordon

Wrecclesham is a village on the southern outskirts of the town of Farnham in Surrey, England. Its local government district is the Borough of Waverley.

== History ==
The manor of Wrecclesham was an estate of Henry of Westminster and Blois, a powerful 13th-century bishop who owned most of the farmland, in what was then Farnham and soon became the linked parishes of Farnham and Frensham in the Farnham Hundred. Farnham remains part of the address for Wrecclesham, as its post town. In 1840 Wrecclesham became a village in its own right, when its first parish church was built, and is now a civil parish.

== Notable places ==
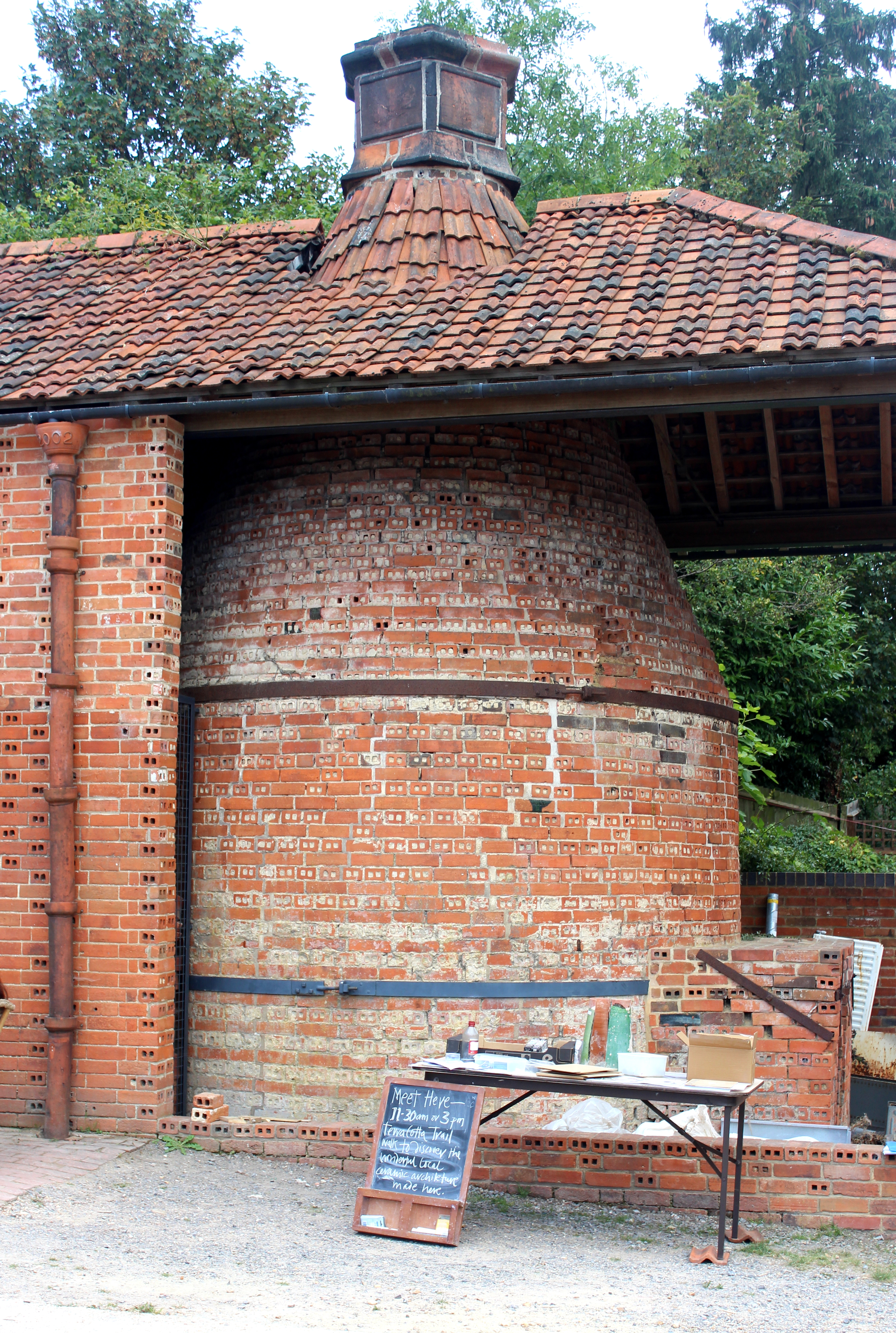
Farnham Pottery Kiln

Wrecclesham's historic character is shown by the presence of the Farnham Pottery, one of the best-preserved examples of a working Victorian country pottery in England and is Grade II-listed. It serves as a café for locals. Just past Wrecclesham Hill is the hamlet of Holt Pound; what is now the Holt Pound recreation ground was one of the chief cricket grounds in Surrey. It was used as the venue for three first-class matches between 1791 and 1809 as well as for a number of minor matches.

=== Runwick ===
Runwick (51.205°N 0.826°W) is located across the A31 road, north of Wrecclesham. It is made up of small holdings on the Hampshire-Surrey border. The '-wick' part of the name meant ″hamlet″ and, from the 13th-century, ″farm″, and is still used in the far east of England to mean ″farm″. The ″run″ part of the name relates to an Anglo Saxon England owner, as in Runfold, which is a similar distance from Farnham.

== Transport ==
The A325 road passes through Wrecclesham, connecting it to the garrison towns of Bordon in the south and Aldershot in the north. The A31, connecting Farnham to Alton, runs close by the village.

== Education ==
Wrecclesham has one primary school, St. Peter's C of E School on Little Green Lane. The presence of Weydon School in Wrecclesham makes it the major education centre of the area because there are no secondary schools in central Farnham.

== Places of worship ==
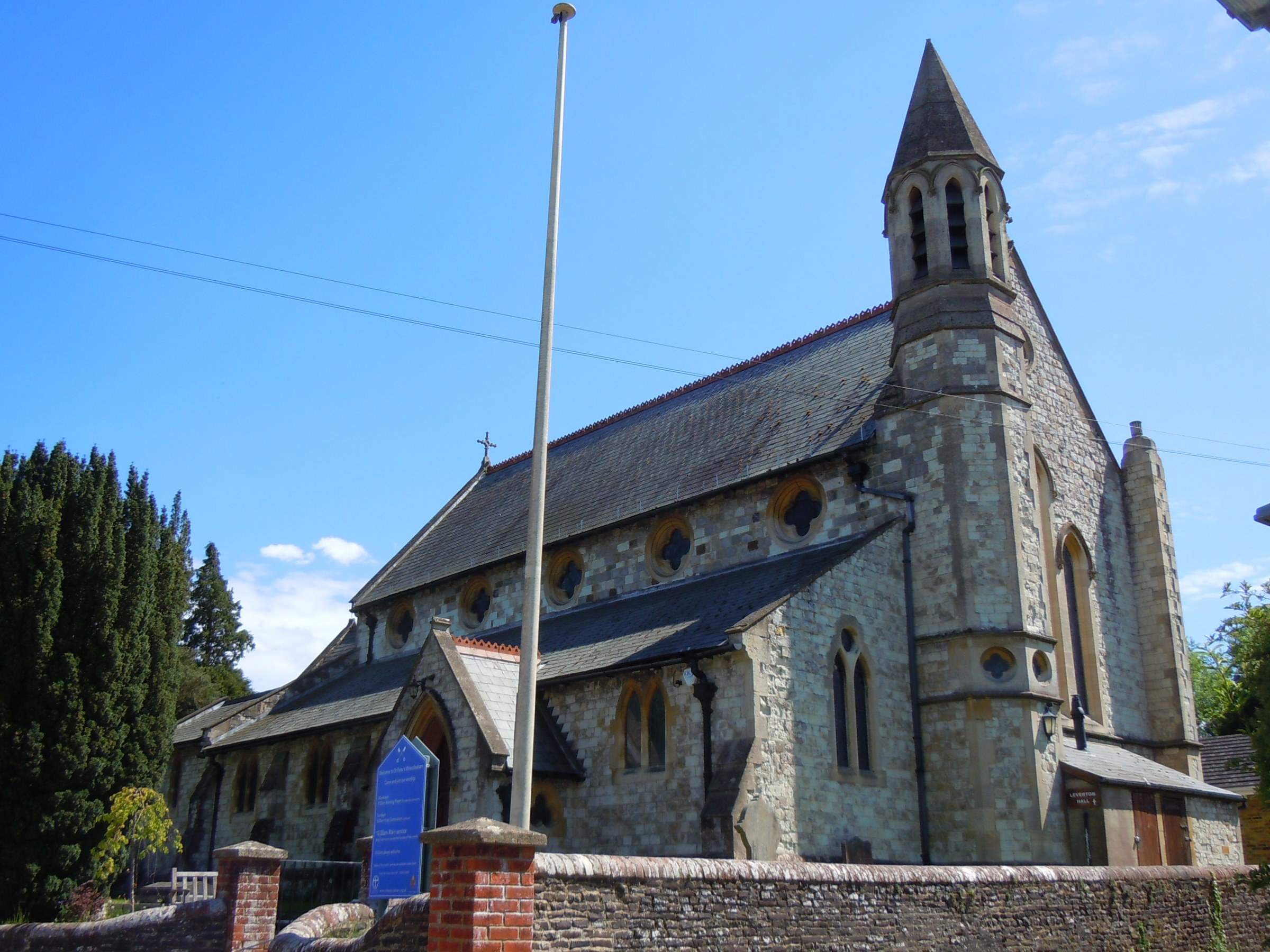
St Peter's Church, Wrecclesham

St Peter's Church is the oldest church in the parish and was consecrated in 1840 by the Bishop of Winchester, Charles Sumner. At the time the population was believed to be around 800. Grace Church is a newer Baptist church, founded in 2013, which meets in St Peter's School.

== Sport ==
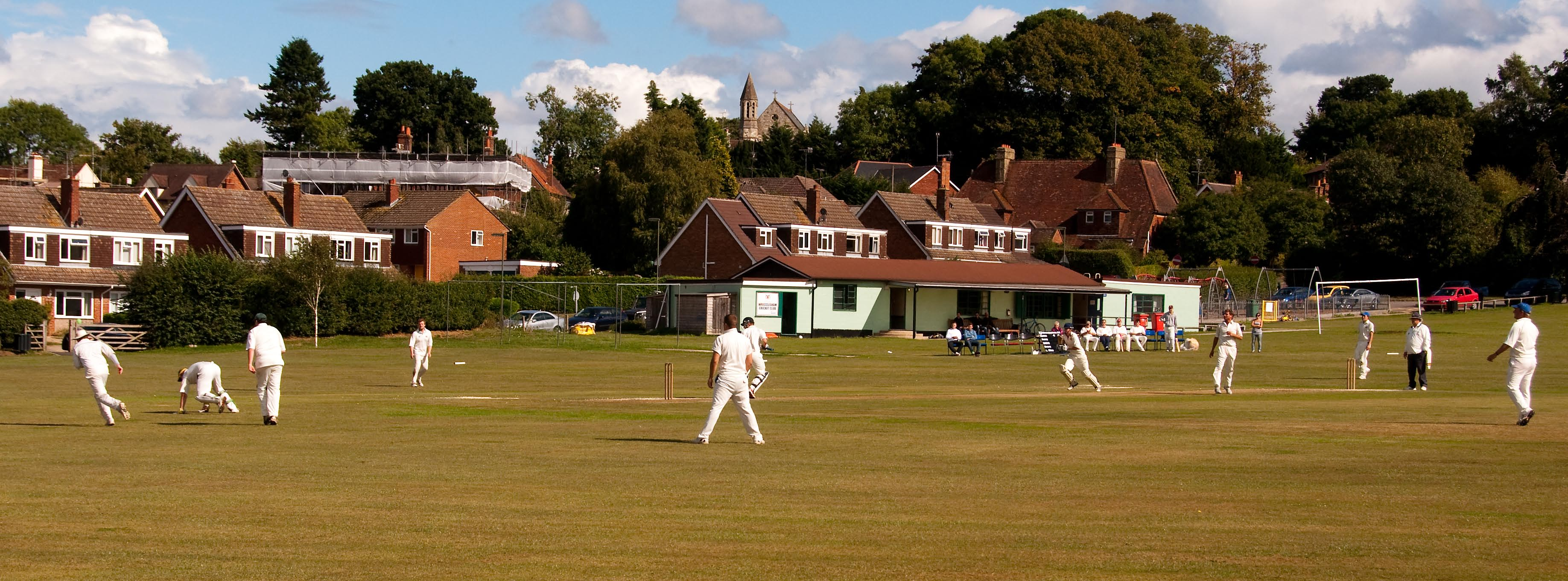
Wrecclesham Recreation ground with the church in the background

Wrecclesham recreation ground caters for cricket, football, rugby and tennis clubs. This is where Jonny Wilkinson and Graham Thorpe started careers in their professional sports, as well as many sportsmen of some generations before such as Billy Beldham and Vic Cannings.

Cricket

Wrecclesham Cricket Club can be linked back to 4 May 1901, where an advert in the Farnham Herald was posted to find players willing to play cricket. The club moved to the recreation ground in Riverdale in the 1930s. Competing in the Farnham and District Cricket league, the club won its first honours in 1934 and 1936.

Wrecclesham joined the I’Anson competition in 1953 and won it in 1956. In 2008, Wrecclesham's 1st XI cricket team were relegated to the Division 4 (of 6) of the I’Anson league. However, in the following 3 seasons, the club earned three consecutive promotions. The Farnham Herald recognised this achievement, publishing with the statement ‘there is no precedent for an established club winning three consecutive promotions as Wrecclesham have done’, praising the teams ‘high team ethic’. The club's crest, made in 2008, is of an owl over a pottery kiln, referencing the Farnham Pottery which was widely known for its 'owl jugs' which were produced up to the 1950s.

Association Football

Wrecclesham Football Club joined the Surrey County Intermediate League (Western) in 2007 and won its Premier Division in 2011. The club's 1st XI team opted to promotion to the top division of the Aldershot & District Football League where it has a second team who play some divisions below. Wrecclesham Football Club folded at the end of the 2013/14 season. After the folding of Wrecclesham FC, United Football Club of Farnham (UFC Farnham) became the only football club based in Wrecclesham from the 2014/15 season with their first and reserve teams playing in the Guildford & Woking Alliance Football League Divisions Three and Five respectively. In May 2016 it was announced that UFC Farnham would merge with the Wrecclesham Social Club to once again become Wrecclesham FC, continuing the tradition of a club which was founded in 1904.

In 2019 Badshot Lea F.C. opened The Operatix Community Ground at Westfield Lane, the site previously used by Farnham Rugby Club. Their first game at the ground was played against Aldershot Town F.C. of the Vanarama National League on 6 July 2019 with an attendance of over 600 people. In 2007, Badshot Lea F.C. were promoted to the Football Association National Non-League Pyramid. They ground-shared at several clubs so that they could meet the FA Ground Compliance requirements, before settling at the old Farnham Rugby Club ground in Wrecclesham. Their men's 1st Xl compete in national competitions such as the FA Cup and FA Vase. Badshot Lea Ladies 1st Xl compete in the Thames Valley Counties Women's Football League Div 1 and the Women's FA Cup, and the youth plays in various league competitions in Surrey and Hampshire.

== Notable people ==
Brian Vesey-Fitzgerald (1900 – 1981), naturalist and author, lived at Long Croft in the village.

== See also ==
- Wrecclesham Traincare Depot
