= Henry J. Lloyd =

English cricketer

Henry James Lloyd (2 February 1794 – 3 September 1853) was an English amateur cricketer who played from 1815 to 1830.

Lloyd was born at Marylebone, London. Mainly associated with Marylebone Cricket Club (MCC), he made 34 known appearances in important matches. He played for several predominantly amateur teams including the Gentlemen in the Gentlemen v Players series. He died at Brighton, Sussex.

== Sources ==
- Haygarth, Arthur (1862). Scores & Biographies, Volume 1 (1744-1826). Lillywhite.
- Haygarth, Arthur (1862). Scores & Biographies, Volume 2 (1827-1840). Lillywhite.
