= Perriam Down =

18th Century English Cricket Ground

Coordinates: 51.256°N 1.623°W

Perriam Down cricket ground
- Interactive map of Perriam Down cricket ground
- Location: Ludgershall, Wiltshire
- Home club: Assheton Smith's XI
- Establishment: 1787
- Last used: 1796

Perriam Down or Perriam Downs, near Ludgershall, Wiltshire, was a venue for cricket matches, and some other matches between 1787 and 1796. It was a favoured venue of landowner Thomas Assheton Smith I who patronised cricket in the area and organised all the matches.
