= 1775 English cricket season =

Cricket season review

In the 1775 English cricket season, John Small scored the sport's earliest-known century in a historically important eleven-a-side match, and his Hambledon colleague Thomas Brett achieved the earliest-known ten-wicket haul.

Small also featured in the famous single wicket contest which precipitated the addition of the third stump to the wickets. Details of sixteen important matches are known. (Note: Any match listed in the ACS' Important Match Guide (1981) is historically important, and therefore of the highest standard, whether or not a scorecard might exist. The same applies to numerous matches discovered by researchers since 1981. For further information, see First-class cricket.)

== Single wicket and the third stump ==
Demands for the third stump were voiced after a single wicket match at the Artillery Ground in May. The match was five-a-side between Kent and Hampshire on 22 & 23 May, and Hampshire won by 1 wicket.

Lumpy Stevens played as a given man for Kent. While he was bowling to John Small, he beat the bat at least three times only for the ball to pass between the stumps without disturbing the wicket, which at that time still consisted of two uprights and a crosspiece. Although the petition was granted soon afterwards, research has discovered that the introduction of the third stump was gradual in practice, and the two-stump wicket continued to be used for a number of years yet in many matches.

== Hampshire v Kent ==
Besides their single wicket encounter, Hampshire and Kent met in three eleven-a-side games. The first of these was 14 and 15 June on Sevenoaks Vine, where Kent won by 110 runs despite having been 53 behind after the first innings. Lumpy Stevens, again playing as a given man for Kent, took eight all-bowled wickets (including five in the second innings); and Thomas Pattenden scored 72. William Hogsflesh made his last known appearance for Hampshire, and Tom Taylor made his known debut. Taylor became one of the most outstanding all-rounders of the late 18th century, and played until 1798.

The teams met again 29 and 30 June on Broadhalfpenny Down, where Hampshire won by 9 wickets. Kent scored 84 and 147 (Joseph Miller 71); Hampshire scored 219 (George Leer 79) & 18/1. Arthur Haygarth says he obtained the details from the Hampshire Chronicle. No bowling or fielding details are known. The margin between the teams' final totals is 6, so Hampshire added six after the scores were level, but it was not necessarily done in one hit as they would normally play out the over even after victory was achieved; Richard Francis scored 10 out of the 18/1, but it is not known if he made the winning hit.

Little is known about the third match, played 31 July at Guildford Bason, except that Kent won with the help of Lumpy and Thomas White as given men. There was a brief report in the Reading Mercury on Saturday, 5 August.

== Hampshire v Surrey ==
=== The first 10wM ===
Hampshire v Surrey
6 and 8 July on Laleham Burway.
Surrey won by 69 runs.
Thomas Brett achieved the earliest known ten-wicket haul by taking eleven all-bowled wickets in the match. He took seven in the first innings and four in the second, also holding a catch. His first innings haul is also the first recorded instance of a bowler taking seven in an innings. Despite his efforts, Hampshire lost by 69 runs. Surrey scored 76 and 163 (John Minshull 45, Joseph Miller 42); Hampshire scored 51 and 119 (James Aylward 38). Haygarth says he got the details from "the old printed scorebook" but acknowledges that another account differs in some of the details.

=== The first top-class century ===
Hampshire v Surrey
13 to 15 July on Broadhalfpenny Down.
Hampshire won by 296 runs.
John Small scored 136 for Hampshire, a new record for the highest individual innings, and the first century to be definitely recorded in a senior match, though Small himself may well have achieved the feat seven years earlier when he scored 140-plus as a match total. Hampshire scored 168 (Francis 45, Small 38) and 357 (Small 136, Nyren 98, Brett 68); Surrey scored 151 (Henry Attfield 49) and 78/3 innings forfeited.

== Chertsey matches ==
Kent, London & Surrey v Chertsey
28 to 30 August on the Artillery Ground.
Chertsey won by 157 runs. Chertsey scored 107 & 153; the combined team replied with 55 & 48.

Chertsey v Coulsdon
7 to 9 September on Laleham Burway.
Chertsey won by 172 runs.
Chertsey scored 152 (William Yalden 77) and 148 (Yalden 71); Coulsdon replied with 43 (Lumpy 3w) and 85 (Constantine Phillips 31; William Bartholomew 4w, Lumpy 3w).
There were two Bartholomews of Chertsey who, in other scorecards, are named as Rev. Bartholomew Sr and Mr Bartholomew Jr. It is believed (and has been assumed) that the junior was William Bartholomew, who also played for Surrey at the time, and that it was he who shared the bowling with Lumpy. The senior is believed to be the Reverend Charles Bartholomew, a Chertsey Club stalwart who played occasionally in the 1770s, but may have been a regular in times past.

Chertsey v Dartford
21 and 22 September on Laleham Burway.
Chertsey won by 1 wicket.
Dartford scored 57 (W. Bartholomew 6w, Lumpy 3w) and 97 (Goulson 24*; W. Bartholomew 3w); Chertsey made 74 (William Bullen 4w, John Frame 2w) and 81/9 (W. Yalden 18).

Chertsey v London
25 to 27 September on Laleham Burway.
Chertsey won by 44 runs.
Chertsey scored 106 (W. Yalden 27; John Wood 3w) and 122 (J. Minshull 54, John Wood 5w); London made 101 (William Brazier 31; W. Bartholomew 4w, Lumpy 3w) and 83 (C. Phillips 32*, W. Brazier 27; Lumpy 7w). Lumpy achieved the second known instance of both 7 wickets in an innings, and 10wM. Again, the figures are bowled dismissals only. John Wood became the fourth player known to have achieved 5wI.

== Other events ==
Two "alphabetical matches" were organised by the Duke of Dorset, but no post-match reports have been found. The first was on the Artillery Ground on 29 May, the second two days later on Moulsey Hurst.

On Monday, 29 May, there was a game at the Old Field ground in Bray, Berkshire, between the Maidenhead and Risborough clubs with Lumpy Stevens assisting the former, while a player called Briggs was a given man for Risborough. This is the first reference found that is specific to the Maidenhead club at Old Field. This club shortly became synonymous with Berkshire as a county team.

On 10 and 11 July, a combined Kent & London team played Coulsdon on the Artillery Ground. The result is unknown. Coulsdon then played Sussex on 19 and 26 July at Smitham Bottom and Henfield Common respectively. Coulsdon won the first match; the result of the second is unknown. Both matches were advertised in the Sussex Weekly Advertiser.

A game on Thursday, 20 July was called "London v Surrey" but the stake was only £10 a side.

On 4 September, there was another Hambledon Parish versus Hampshire match, this one played on Kilmiston Down; Hampshire won by an unknown margin.

== First mentions ==
=== Clubs and teams ===
- Kent & London
- Kent, London & Surrey
- Maidenhead
- Risborough

=== Players ===
- Rev. Charles Bartholomew (Chertsey)
- Daniel Etheridge (Chertsey)
- Richard Lipscomb (Chertsey)
- Thomas Swayne (Chertsey)
- Tom Taylor (Hampshire)

=== Venues ===
- Kilmiston Down
- Old Field, Bray

== Bibliography ==
- ACS (1981). A Guide to Important Cricket Matches Played in the British Isles 1709–1863. Nottingham: ACS. OCLC 85045528.
- Ashley-Cooper, F. S. (1924). Hambledon Cricket Chronicle: 1772–1796. London: Jenkins. OCLC 38498574.
- Bowen, Rowland (1970). Cricket: A History of its Growth and Development. London: Eyre & Spottiswoode. ISBN 978-04-13278-60-9.
- Buckley, G. B. (1935). Fresh Light on 18th Century Cricket. Birmingham: Cotterell & Co. OCLC 23450280.
- Haygarth, Arthur (1996) [1862]. Scores & Biographies, Volume 1 (1744–1826). Kennington: Frederick Lillywhite. ISBN 978-19-00592-23-9.
- McCann, Tim (2004). Sussex Cricket in the Eighteenth Century (PDF). Vol. 88. Lewes: West Sussex Record Office. ISBN 978-08-54450-55-8.
- Waghorn, H. T. (2005) [1906]. The Dawn of Cricket. London: J. W. McKenzie. ISBN 978-09-47821-17-3.
