= Francis Booker =

English cricketer (1746–1806)

Francis Booker (8 October 1746 – 13 November 1806) was an English cricketer who was born in the Kent village of Eynsford, which is about seven miles north of Sevenoaks, and five south of Dartford. He lived his whole life there, and kept the Soho Inn, which was a coaching inn. Booker was a left-handed batter who was noted as a fine hitter of the ball, and a very good outfielder. He was an occasional left arm underarm bowler, but his pace and style are unknown. Booker is, in fact, one of cricket's earliest known left-handers, like his contemporary Richard Nyren.

Booker mostly played for Kent, and was a member of several England teams. He was rated a good single wicket player. His known career was from 1773 to 1790, and he is mentioned by sources in connection with more than fifty important matches, including single wicket games.

Arthur Haygarth visited Eynsford in 1860 when he was working on his biographical piece for Francis Booker, and said he was helped by Thomas Booker, the nephew of Francis.

== Haygarth's account ==
Booker is the subject of the seventh biography in Haygarth's Scores & Biographies. Haygarth says much of his account is sourced to Thomas Booker, a nephew of Francis Booker who was resident at Eynsford in 1860. Francis Booker was said to be about 5 ft 8 inches tall, and weighed around 12 stone. Haygarth describes him as "one of the cracks of his day". He provides an anecdote of Booker once jumping over a fence at Sevenoaks Vine, and still catching the ball. He reportedly defeated William Bullen in a single wicket match at Lord's Old Ground to win £50, a considerable sum in those days, but the score of this match has not been preserved.

Haygarth recalled a comment by John Nyren about Booker in The Cricketers of My Time. Nyren said Booker was a player "of the first rank, though not the first of that rank". He added that Booker was an "excellent and steady batter, and a sure field".

== "Known" debut ==
The first match in which Booker is known to have played was for Kent against Surrey at Laleham Burway, in Chertsey. This match was played 21/22 June 1773, when he was 26 years old and, as Haygarth commented, Booker must have been playing for several years already. Match scorecards had rarely been compiled before 1772. As was typical of early scorecards, no bowling or fielding data was recorded at this match. The batters' scores were recorded, but not if they were actually dismissed. Booker was listed seventh in the Kent batting order, (Note: In the 18th century, teams were listed on scorecards by social status with nobility and gentry first.) and he scored 2 and 4. Surrey won the match by 34 runs.

== No middle stump ==
In May 1775, Booker took part in what must be the most famous single wicket match ever played. He was one of Five of Kent which included the great bowler Lumpy as a given man. The other three Kent players were William Brazier, William Bullen, and Joseph Miller. Their opponents were Five of Hambledon, who included Thomas White as a given man. The Hambledon players were Tom Brett, George Leer, Tom Sueter, and master batter John Small. Booker played very well in this game and, in doing so, helped to set up the game's dramatic finale.

Kent batted first, and were dismissed for only 37 by Brett and White. Booker scored 8. Hambledon scored 92 in reply for a first innings lead of 55. Small made 75 of those 92 runs, and all five Hambledon batsmen were bowled by Lumpy. In their second innings, Kent made 102 to avoid the innings defeat, and gave their bowlers hope by establishing a lead of 47. Bullen made the top score of 56, and Booker scored 35, a significant contribution. Hambledon needed 48 to win, but they were against Lumpy so the result was no certainty. Lumpy bowled White, Brett and Sueter. Booker caught Leer.

Small was last man in, and he still needed to score 14. It was master bowler versus master batter, and the master batter won, but only after Lumpy had three times sent the ball through the two-stump wicket without disturbing it. It was frustration for Lumpy, but Small got the runs he needed, and Hambledon won the match by one wicket.

In due course, the three-stump wicket was introduced in response to Lumpy's justifiable protests. Booker had certainly played his part.

== Last known match ==
Booker's final known appearance was in September 1790 when he played for Stephen Amherst's West Kent against East Kent selected by Horatio Mann. Because of bad weather, it was played over five days from 7 to 11 September. The match was played on Mann's Bishopsbourne Paddock at Bishopsbourne, near Canterbury. Amherst's XI won by 130 runs. They had first innings and scored 119. Booker had the second highest score with 29. Mann's XI were dismissed for 97, and Amherst's team then took the advantage with 148 in their second innings for a lead of 270, which was then substantial. Mann's XI were clearly not up to the task, and were all out for only 40. Booker in his last known innings made only 3. He held one catch, but he may not have bowled in the match. He was nearly 44 years old, so it is fair to assume he retired at the end of the 1790 season.

Francis Booker died, aged 60, on Thursday, 13 November 1806.

== Venues where Booker is known to have played ==
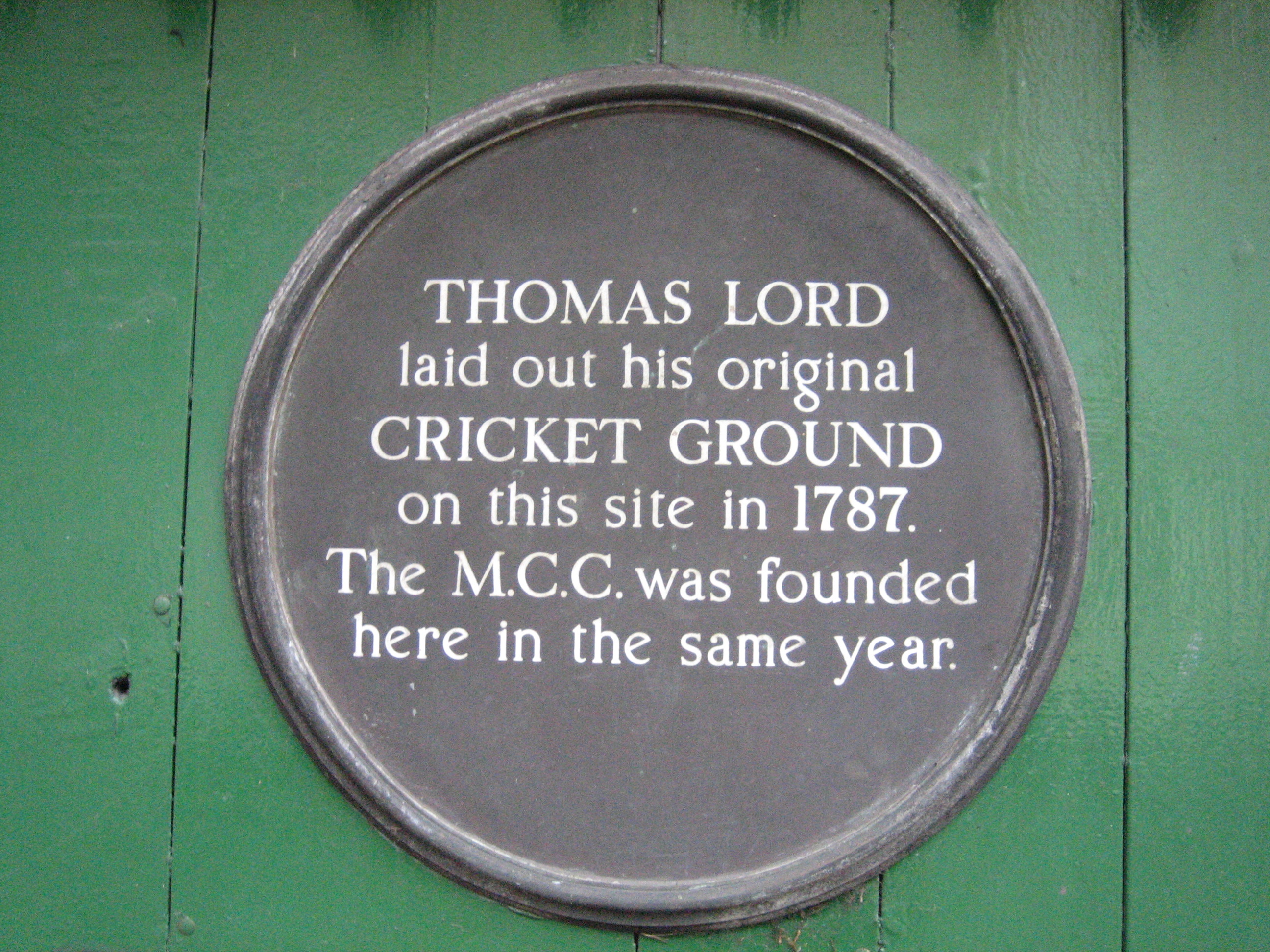
This plaque in Dorset Square commemorates the original Lord's ground, which opened in 1787. Francis Booker played there that year.

There are only a dozen known venues, but Booker was one of very few players who took part in important matches at all three of Hambledon's grounds, including the little-known Cheden Holt. He also played at both the Artillery Ground and the original Lord's. The grounds were:

- Artillery Ground, Finsbury
- Bishopsbourne Paddock, Bishopsbourne
- Broadhalfpenny Down, Hambledon
- Cheden Holt, Hambledon
- Itchin Stoke Down, Alresford
- Laleham Burway, Chertsey
- Lord's Old Ground, Marylebone
- Moulsey Hurst, West Molesey
- Star Inn, Coxheath
- The Old Park, Canterbury
- The Vine, Sevenoaks
- Windmill Down, Hambledon

== Bibliography ==
- Haygarth, Arthur (1996) [1862]. Scores & Biographies, Volume 1 (1744–1826). Kennington: Frederick Lillywhite. ISBN 978-19-00592-23-9.
- Nyren, John (1998) [1832]. Mote, Ashley (ed.). The Cricketers of my Time. London: Robson Publishing. ISBN 978-18-61051-68-4.
