= The Cricketers of My Time =

Cricket book by John Nyren

The Cricketers of My Time is a memoir of cricket, nominally written by the former Hambledon cricketer John Nyren about the players of the late 18th century, most of whom he knew personally. Nyren, who had no recognised literary skill, collaborated with the eminent Shakespearean scholar Charles Cowden Clarke to produce his work. It is believed that Cowden Clarke recorded Nyren's verbal reminiscences and so "ghosted" the text.

The work became a major source for the history and personalities of Georgian cricket and has also come to be regarded as the first classic in cricket's now rich literary history. Writing in 1957, John Arlott described it as "still the finest study of cricket and cricketers ever written".

== Publications ==
The Cricketers of My Time was first published in serial form by a weekly London newspaper called The Town in 1832. The following year, the series with some modifications appeared as the second part of an instructional book entitled The Young Cricketer's Tutor, which was also the title of the book's first part. There was a third part called A Few Memoranda Respecting the Progress of Cricket and that is generally referred to as the Memoranda. The first edition of the full book was published by Effingham Wilson of the Royal Exchange, London in June 1833, and was reviewed by the Rev. John Mitford for The Gentleman's Magazine in July 1833.

John Nyren died in 1837, but there was a second edition of the book in 1840 followed by eleven subsequent editions to 1855. These editions were retitled Nyren's Cricketers Guide. A further edition, with introduction, footnotes and appendices by F. S. Ashley-Cooper, was published by Gay & Bird in 1902. In 1907, there was another edition produced by E. V. Lucas titled The Hambledon Men. Lucas' edition included Mitford's review and the interview by James Pycroft of Billy Beldham, one of Nyren's particular heroes, as well as pieces by Arthur Haygarth and Mary Russell Mitford, accompanied by Lucas's own commentary on the source material.

In 1996, during researches for his Hambledon book The Glory Days of Cricket, Ashley Mote discovered a handwritten manuscript of The Cricketers of My Time which was signed and dated March 1833. A forensic examination was undertaken to determine the age of the manuscript and proved that it was written within a few years at most of that date, which was three months after the serial in The Town concluded and three months before the first edition of The Young Cricketer's Tutor was published. In addition, a handwriting analysis verified that neither Nyren nor Cowden Clarke wrote the manuscript, which is believed to have been the work of a professional copyist using a steel-nib pen. There are a number of differences between the serial and the manuscript, but the version in the book's first edition has only minor differences from the manuscript.

In 1998, Mote published his findings in a new version of The Cricketers of My Time which compares the serial with both the manuscript and the first edition.

== Value as a source ==
Much of historical, social and literary value can be gleaned from Nyren's work in which his essential purpose was to provide biographical information about the players whom he knew and remembered. For the most part, they were associated with the Hambledon Club and played for Hampshire, but he also talked about cricketers from Surrey and Kent who were Hampshire's usual opponents, sometimes in the form of an England team. Nyren is now regarded as a key source for information about these players.

=== John Small ===
Nyren had great admiration for master batsman John Small, whose son Jack Small seems to have been his best friend. In his appraisal of John Small senior, Nyren says:

the name of John Small, the elder, shines among them (the contemporary players) in all the lustre of a star of the first magnitude.

John Small, who scored the earliest known century in important matches, was certainly a major reason for Hampshire's success in the Hambledon era.

=== Richard Nyren ===
Nyren says much about his own father, Richard Nyren, who was the Hambledon Club captain, including a description of him as "(the finest) specimen of the thorough-bred old English yeoman". Although John Nyren was at pains to show undue respect, almost amounting to obsequious fawning where social superiors were concerned (especially the unsavoury Lord Frederick Beauclerk), he tells of his father "maintaining an opinion with great firmness against the 3rd Duke of Dorset and Sir Horatio Mann and being proved right". But while his father reportedly stood up to aristocrats, John Nyren himself resorted to "social grovelling" via the addition to his text of "ingratiating remarks addressed to the great and powerful".

=== The "monster bat" incident ===
The Memoranda seems to have been added hastily and is not generally seen as providing much value, but it does include the following:

Several years since (I do not recollect the precise date) a player, named White, of Ryegate (sic), brought a bat to a match, which being the width of the stumps, effectually defended his wicket from the bowler : and, in consequence, a law was passed limiting the future width of the bat to 4¼ inches. Another law was decreed that the ball should not weigh less than 5½ oz, or more than 5¾ oz.

The Laws of cricket still stipulate the limit on the width of the bat that was agreed by the Hambledon Club as a result of the "Monster Bat Incident". While Nyren, a boy at the time of the incident in 1771, may have thought that White was cheating, it is now believed that he forced an issue as the modern straight bats were a recent innovation, replacing the curved bat which itself replaced the original hockey-stick shape, and no standard dimensions had as yet been agreed.

=== Lamborn ===
One of Nyren's most vivid biographical sketches is his chapter on Lamborn, who was clearly a ripe character. But this chapter has significance for cricket's history and evolution as Lamborn was evidently the originator of the underarm off-break. Nyren says:

He was a bowler – right-handed, and he had the most extraordinary delivery I ever saw. The ball was delivered quite low, and with a twist (sic); not like that of the generality of right-handed bowlers, but just the reverse way : that is, if bowling to a right-handed hitter, his ball would twist from the off stump into the leg.

While the "general" way for an overarm bowler to spin the ball is from off to leg (i.e., an off-break), the opposite was true for the underarm bowlers and Lamborn was thus one of bowling's great innovators. The pitched delivery was still new, having been introduced in the 1760s, when Lamborn played (i.e., his known career was from 1777 to 1781). Until the 1760s, bowlers had always rolled or skimmed the ball towards the batsman so spin bowling itself was a new skill. Nyren consistently refers to "spin" as "twist".

== Legacy ==
The Cricketers of My Time lacks structure and is often disjointed to the extent that it resembles "a couple of old cricketers on Test Match Special reminiscing about the great players of the past". Nevertheless, it remains an "extraordinarily vivid, exciting and unique book". Unless new sources of information about Georgian cricket should come to light, "nothing could hope to replace the charm of the account of those great days handed down to us by John Nyren". David Underdown called it "a wonderfully evocative, nostalgic account of the (Hambledon) Club's great days in the 1770s and 1780s.

Harry Altham pointed out that the book was written some forty to fifty years after the zenith of Hambledon and so "it is not to be wondered at" that Nyren was often "vague as to detail and very sparing of date and place". Altham calls Nyren the "Herodotus, and not the Thucydides, of cricket" and writes of Nyren's ability to "make his characters live more vividly".

Rowland Bowen, often a prickly critic of other writers, described The Cricketers of My Time as "the locus classicus for late eighteenth century cricket personalities" and added that "the book is outstanding as literature". Bowen was convinced that Cowden Clarke was the author and had used Nyren's spoken reminiscences as his source. Bowen wrote that "Clarke makes us hear the very sound of the old man himself talking". Underdown said that it is "not important" who wrote the actual text as "in either case it originated with Nyren".

Apart from the biographical information for which it is invaluable, the book contains other pieces of information that are useful and sometimes original. For example, Nyren is the first writer to mention boundaries in a cricketing context, although it meant something different then as they were parallel lines in single wicket matches used to define the limits of the outfield.

A noted counterpoint in Nyren's work is his eulogy of the Hambledon era against his contempt for the roundarm era which began a few years before The Cricketers of My Time was published. Nyren made several references to roundarm as "throwing". In short, he "reckoned the game had been ruined by allowing roundarm". According to Altham, Nyren was one of the foremost critics of roundarm along with William Ward and Thomas Lord. Altham recounts how Nyren stated in his first edition, in the section headed "Protest", that Nyren prophesied: "the elegant and scientific game of cricket will degenerate into a mere exhibition of rough, coarse horseplay!"

== Plagiarism ==
Mote's 1998 edition of the book begins with an introduction in which he outlines the discovery of the manuscript and the actions that followed up to publication of the new version. In addition, he criticised Nyren's work and pointed out the plagiarism that is evident in the part called The Young Cricketer's Tutor. Mote believes that Nyren included this piece to add bulk to what would otherwise have been a slim volume.

There is no evidence of plagiarism in The Cricketers of My Time itself (or in the short Memoranda) which contains "such qualities of spontaneity that they might almost have been taken from dictation straight onto the page".

In 1801, Thomas Boxall published Rules and Instructions for Playing at the Game of Cricket and this was "the first attempt to set laws, methods and tactics down on paper". The work, which had less than 6,000 words, was revised and reprinted several times to 1804 and was well received. In 1816, the writer John Baxter published Instructions and Rules for Playing the Noble Game of Cricket under the name of William Lambert. This was also successful and was reprinted a number of times till 1828 with a further listed edition in 1832 that has been lost.

Although Lambert was an outstanding player in the Napoleonic period, he could not read or write and so Baxter was cricket's first "ghost writer".

The Lambert/Baxter book borrowed heavily from Boxall but was longer and had a structured format. In The Young Cricketer's Tutor, Nyren blatantly copied Lambert's structure and attempted to present new content by overwriting Lambert's constructions, generally with longer sentences.

== Cricketers mentioned in the book ==
Numerous Georgian players are described in the book but, as the newest version's editor has pointed out, there are several omissions including John Boorman, William Bowra, William Bullen, Robert Clifford, Samuel Colchin, John Edmeads, William Fennex and Richard Aubrey Veck; while other notable players such as Francis Booker, Robert Robinson and Thomas Scott receive only the briefest of mentions.

In the following table, the page numbers given are those in the newest version of the book edited by Mote in 1998. The date published in The Town refers to the relevant sections in which each player was discussed. The essential difference between Mote's version and the original 1833 book is that Mote arranged the parts in the order that they were written: hence, The Cricketers of My Time comes first and precedes The Young Cricketer's Tutor with the Memoranda at the end.

player's name	date of section's publication in The Town	page numbers in 1998 edition
Andrew Freemantle	9 December 1832	100–103
Billy Beldham	25 November 1832	89–92
Billy Beldham	addition to 1833 edition	107
4th Earl of Tankerville	14 October 1832	68–70
4th Earl of Tankerville	21 October 1832	75–76
Charles Powlett	21 October 1832	74–76
David Harris	18 November 1832	85–87
David Harris	25 November 1832	93–98
David Harris	9 December 1832	99–103
David Harris	addition to 1833 edition	107
E. H. Budd	25 November 1832	95–98
Edward Aburrow	7 October 1832	61–65
Francis Booker	21 October 1832	74–76
John Willes	18 November 1832	85–87
John Willes	9 December 1832	101–103
George Beldham	25 November 1832	89–92
George Leer	7 October 1832	61–65
George Leer	21 October 1832	75–76
George Leer	28 October 1832	78–81
Harry Walker	18 November 1832	85–87
Harry Walker	addition to 1833 edition	107
Jack Small	9 December 1832	101–103
Jack Small	addition to 1833 edition	105–107
James Aylward	18 November 1832	84–87
James Aylward	9 December 1832	101–103
John Bayton	7 October 1832	65
John Frame	7 October 1832	65
John Frame	14 October 1832	70
3rd Duke of Dorset	23 September 1832	56–58
3rd Duke of Dorset	7 October 1832	65
3rd Duke of Dorset	14 October 1832	67–70
3rd Duke of Dorset	21 October 1832	75–76
3rd Duke of Dorset	28 October 1832	79–81
John Freemantle	9 December 1832	100–103
John Hammond	9 December 1832	103
John Minshull	7 October 1832	65
John Minshull	21 October 1832	73–76
John Small	23 September 1832	57–58
John Small	7 October 1832	63
John Small	21 October 1832	74–76
John Small	9 December 1832	101–103
John Small	addition to 1833 edition	105–107
John Wells	25 November 1832	88–92
John Wells	addition to 1833 edition	107
John Wood	14 October 1832	70
Joseph Miller	7 October 1832	65
Joseph Miller	21 October 1832	74–76
Lamborn	14 October 1832	67–70
Lord Frederick Beauclerk	14 October 1832	68–70
Lord Frederick Beauclerk	21 October 1832	75–76
Lord Frederick Beauclerk	28 October 1832	81
Lord Frederick Beauclerk	18 November 1832	85–87
Lord Frederick Beauclerk	25 November 1832	96–98
Lord Frederick Beauclerk	2 December 1832	89–92
Lumpy Stevens	7 October 1832	65
Lumpy Stevens	14 October 1832	68–70
Lumpy Stevens	28 October 1832	79–81
Lumpy Stevens	25 November 1832	97–98
Noah Mann	28 October 1832	77–81
Noah Mann	18 November 1832	83–87
Noah Mann	addition to 1833 edition	107
Peter Stewart	7 October 1832	62–65
Richard Francis	28 October 1832	80–81
Richard May	21 October 1832	74–76
Richard Newland	23 September 1832	56–58
Richard Nyren	23 September 1832	56–58
Richard Nyren	7 October 1832	63
Richard Nyren	14 October 1832	66–70
Richard Nyren	21 October 1832	74–76
Richard Nyren	28 October 1832	79–81
Richard Nyren	18 November 1832	83–87
Richard Nyren	25 November 1832	95–98
Richard Nyren	addition to 1833 edition	105–107
Richard Purchase	28 October 1832	81
Richard Purchase	addition to 1833 edition	107
Robert Robinson	addition to 1833 edition	107
Sir Horatio Mann	23 September 1832	56–58
Sir Horatio Mann	7 October 1832	65
Sir Horatio Mann	28 October 1832	79–81
Sir Horatio Mann	18 November 1832	83–87
Thomas Brett	23 September 1832	55–58
Thomas Brett	7 October 1832	60–65
Thomas Brett	28 October 1832	80–81
Thomas Land	7 October 1832	65
Thomas May	21 October 1832	74–76
Thomas Quiddington	21 October 1832	74–76
Thomas Scott	addition to 1833 edition	107
Tom Taylor	14 October 1832	68–70
Tom Taylor	18 November 1832	84–87
Tom Taylor	addition to 1833 edition	107
Tom Walker	18 November 1832	85–87
Tom Walker	25 November 1832	95–98
Tom Walker	addition to 1833 edition	107
Thomas White	14 October 1832	70
Thomas White	Memoranda	156
Tom Sueter	7 October 1832	60–65
Tom Sueter	21 October 1832	75–76
William Barber	23 September 1832	56–58
William Barber	7 October 1832	65
William Hogsflesh	23 September 1832	56–58
William Hogsflesh	7 October 1832	65
William Yalden	21 October 1832	75–76

== Bibliography ==
- HS Altham, A History of Cricket, Volume 1 (to 1914), George Allen & Unwin, 1962
- John Arlott, Arlott on Cricket, Willow Books, 1984
- Barclays World of Cricket, 3rd edition (ed. E W Swanton), Willow Books, 1986. Article on the Hambledon era written by EDR Eagar.
- Derek Birley, A Social History of English Cricket, Aurum, 1999
- Rowland Bowen, Cricket: A History of its Growth and Development, Eyre & Spottiswoode, 1970
- Ashley Mote, The Glory Days of Cricket, Robson, 1997
- John Nyren, The Cricketers of My Time (ed. Ashley Mote), Robson, 1998
- David Underdown, Start of Play, Allen Lane, 2000
