= Henry Attfield =

English cricketer

Henry Attfield (1756 – c. 1829) was an English cricketer who is recorded in a total of 27 matches between 1773 and 1789. He played mainly for Chertsey and Surrey.

Born at Bagshot, he lived for much of his life in Chertsey, where he was a sawyer by trade. Besides Chertsey and Surrey, Attfield played in three matches for England (i.e., the "rest" of England), and once for the Duke of Dorset's XI. In addition, he was twice a given man for Hampshire. His name was often shortened to 'Field' on match scorecards.

== Cricket career ==
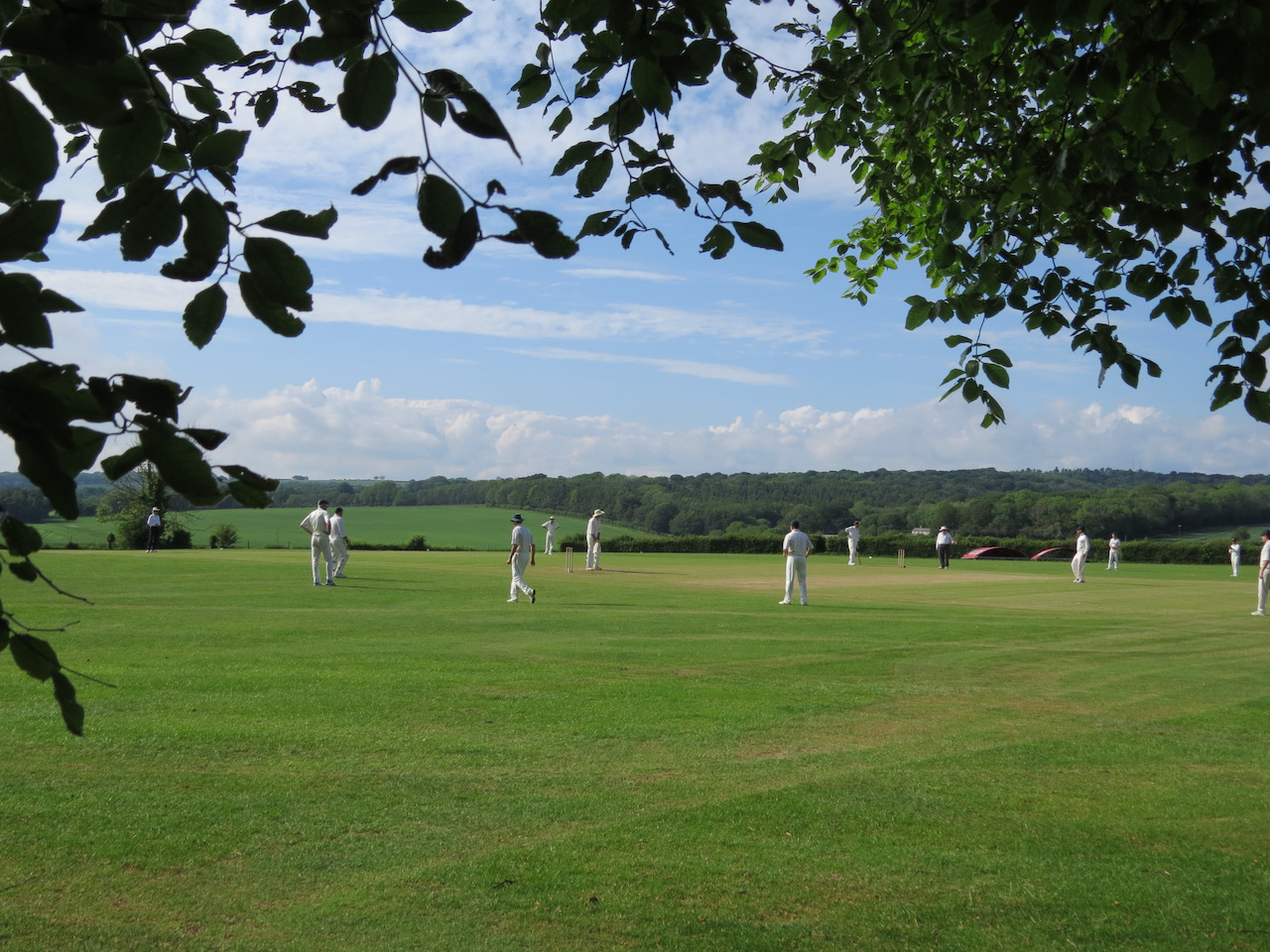
Broadhalfpenny Down, where Henry Attfield played his first known match in 1773.

Attfield made his first known appearance on 26 August 1773 when, aged just 17, he travelled to Hambledon, Hampshire with the Surrey team for a match against Hambledon Town on Broadhalfpenny Down.He scored seven runs out of Surrey's total of 131 in their first innings and three in their second. Later in the year he played twice more for the team, this time against Hampshire.

Attfield is known to have played regularly as his name appears on more than 20 surviving scorecards. (Note: Any match listed in the ACS' Important Match Guide (1981) is historically important, and therefore of the highest standard, whether or not a scorecard might exist. The same applies to numerous matches discovered by researchers since 1981. For further information, see First-class cricket.)

These show that he was usually a middle-order batsman and that he rarely bowled. It is not known if he was right- or left-handed; nor if he had any fielding specialism. His name appears only once in 1774 but then he is recorded five times in 1775. He was selected for England teams against Hampshire at Laleham Burway in July 1777; and again at Broadhalfpenny Down in August 1779. In June 1780, he played for the Duke of Dorset's XI against Sir Horatio Mann's XI at Sevenoaks Vine.

== End of career ==
Attfield's last known match was for the Moulsey Club against Uxbridge on 8 June 1789. He scored 11 and 2 in his two innings and also took one wicket. According to Arthur Haygarth, Attfield continued to live in Chertsey until his death in about 1829 when he was 73 years old. No tombstone was erected in his memory and so Haygarth was uncertain about the date of Attfield's death.

== Sources ==
- ACS (1981). A Guide to Important Cricket Matches Played in the British Isles 1709–1863. Nottingham: ACS. Archived from the original on 20 September 2022.
- ACS (1982). A Guide to FC Cricket Matches Played in the British Isles. Nottingham: ACS.
- Ashley-Cooper, F. S. (1924). Hambledon Cricket Chronicle 1772–1796. Jenkins. ASIN B0008BXCH4.
- Haygarth, Arthur (1862). Scores & Biographies, Volume 1 (1744–1826). Kennington: Frederick Lillywhite. ISBN 978-19-00592-23-9.
- Waghorn, H. T. (1899). Cricket Scores, Notes, &c. From 1730–1773. Edinburgh: Blackwood. ISBN 978-09-47821-17-3.
