= Superstar =

Title

A superstar is someone who has great popular appeal and is widely known, prominent, or successful in their field. Celebrities referred to as "superstars" may include individuals who work as actors, musicians, athletes, and other media-based professions.

== History ==
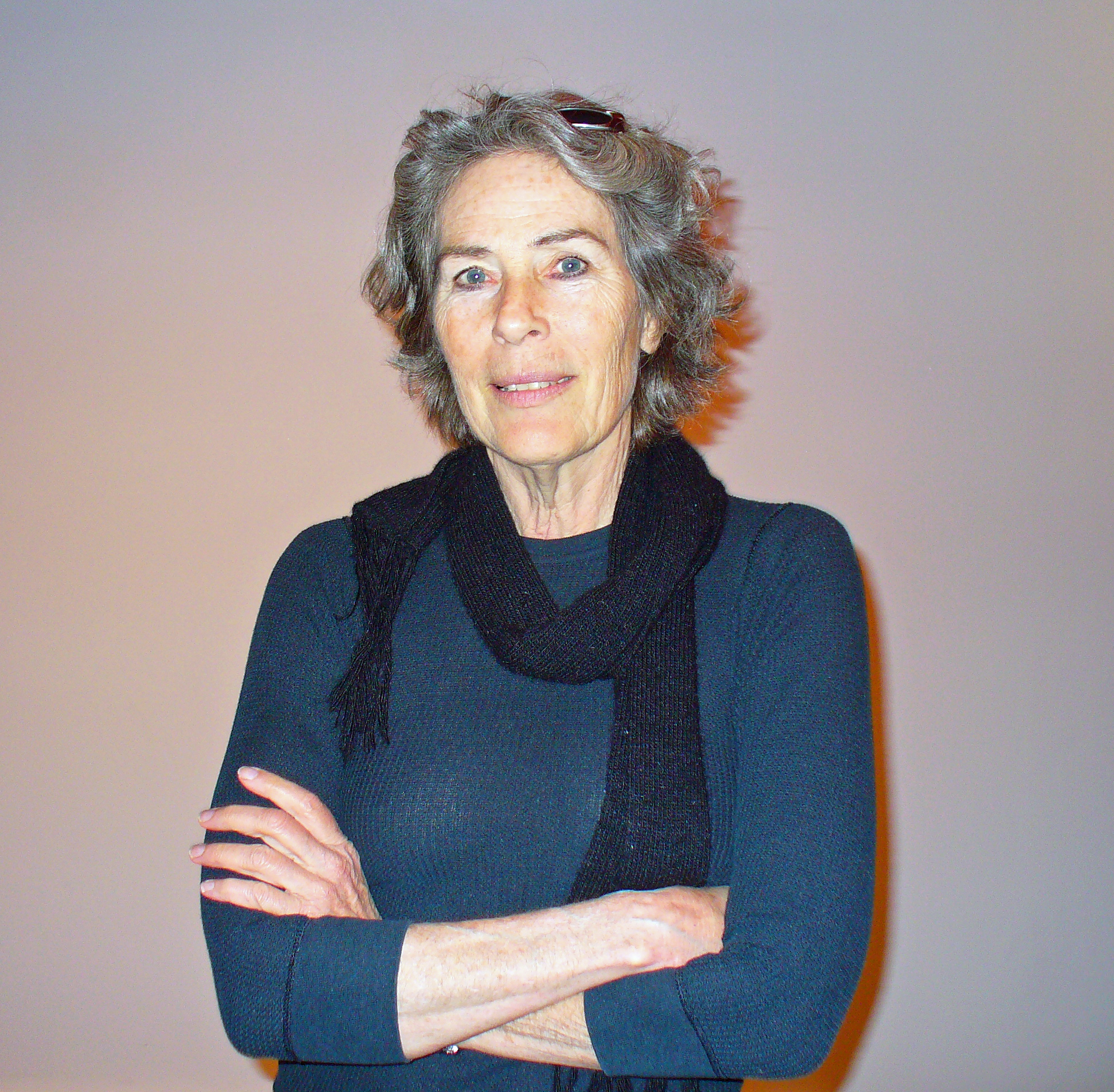
In the 1960s and 1970s, Andy Warhol popularized the term "superstar" to describe people like actress Mary Woronov.

The origin of the term in the context of celebrity is uncertain, but a similar expression is attested in John Nyren's 1832 cricket book The Cricketers of My Time. Nyren described the 18th-century cricketer John Small as "a star of the first magnitude". The earliest use of the term "superstar" has been credited to Frank Patrick in reference to the ice hockey players on his Vancouver Millionaires teams of the 1910s and 1920s, specifically Cyclone Taylor. In the June 1977 edition of Interview magazine, pop artist Andy Warhol was asked by editor Glenn O'Brien who invented the word "superstar". Warhol, known for popularizing the term, responded, "I think it was Jack Smith." O'Brien then asked, "And who were the first superstars?" Warhol responded, "They were all Jack Smith's stars." The term received widespread and commonplace use from the title of the musical Jesus Christ Superstar, in particular the 1970 concept album of the musical and the eponymous hit song. "Super Star" is also the name of a hugely successful rose which Harry Wheatcroft introduced and named in 1960.

By 1909, silent film companies began promoting "picture personalities" by releasing stories about actors to fan magazines and newspapers, as part of a strategy to build "brand loyalty" for their company's actors and films. By the 1920s, Hollywood film company promoters had developed a "massive industrial enterprise" that "peddled a new intangible—fame". Hollywood "image makers" and promotional agents planted rumours, selectively released real or fictitious information to the press, and used other "gimmicks" to create public personas for actors. They then "worked [to] reinforce that persona [and] manage the publicity". Publicists thus "created" the "enduring images" and public perceptions of screen legends such as Rock Hudson, Marilyn Monroe, and Grace Kelly. The development of this "star system" made fame "something that could be fabricated purposely, by the masters of the new 'machinery of glory'".

In 1976, Mattel produced a "Superstar" variation of its Barbie doll. According to Sofia Johansson, the "canonical texts on stardom" include articles by Boorstin (1971), Alberoni (1972), and Dyer (1979) that examined the "representations of stars and on aspects of the Hollywood star system". Johansson notes that "more recent analyses within media and cultural studies (e.g. Gamson 1994; Marshall 1997; Giles 2000; Turner, Marshall and Bonner 2000; Rojek 2001; Turner 2004) have instead dealt with the idea of a pervasive, contemporary, 'celebrity culture'". In an analysis of "celebrity culture", Johansson states that "fame and its constituencies are conceived of as a broader social process, connected to widespread economic, political, technological, and cultural developments".

In the 1980s and 1990s, entertainment publicity tactics became "more subtle and sophisticated", such as using press releases, movie junkets, and community activities. These promotional efforts are targeted and designed using market research "to increase the predictability of success of their media ventures". In some cases, publicity agents may create "provocative advertisements" or make an outrageous public statement to "trigger public controversy and thereby generate 'free' news coverage".

== Socio-psychological theories ==
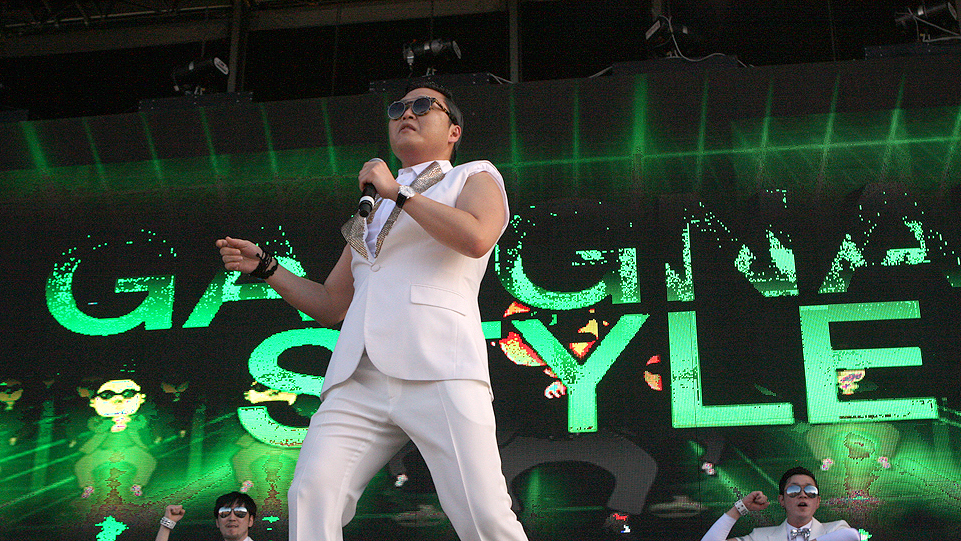
South Korean musician Psy has been referred to as a "globalstar", with his 2012 "Gangnam Style" video becoming the first to reach 1 billion views on YouTube.

According to Roger Caillois, superstars are created by the interplay between "mass media, free enterprise, and competition". Superstars are produced by a mixture of effort on the part of the superstar and mere chance (due to the many arbitrary factors influencing sports, film releases, etc.) and the superstar usually has "extraordinary natural talent augmented by an even more extraordinary perseverance and drive". However, small and relative differences are of decisive importance for "winning or losing by a hair's breadth". It is here that chance plays a role, with Caillois noting that "a sudden gust of wind at the end of a yachting race can mean the difference between stardom and defeat". He states that the role of chance in superstardom is paradoxical because the West is such a "predominantly meritocratic society" which champions the importance of hard work, competition, activity, and determination.

Caillois states that "[since] only one may be first, [a person may] choose to win indirectly through identification with someone else" and that the triumph of the superstar as the most popular actor or musician is in part due to the actions of "those who worship the hero". He says the public believes that the concept of "the manicurist elected beauty queen, the sales girl entrusted with the heroine's role in a super production, the shopkeeper's daughter winning the Tour de France, and the gas station attendant who basks in the limelight as a champion toreador" represents the possibility from the public's perspective that they too may become wealthy and successful. For example, Levine points out that Lars Ulrich, the drummer for Metallica, was a service station attendant before becoming a wealthy rock star and that Harrison Ford was a cabinet maker before becoming a rich and famous actor.

Caillois calls superstars' huge incomes and accolades "disguised lotteries" and a "special kind of game of chance". For example, the grand prizes for literary competitions "bring fortune and glory to a writer for several years". Caillois notes that a superstar cannot merely be successful at some activity—they must also be richly rewarded. He says that the "material reward of the superstar is a necessary ingredient (for the glory of the star) for the identification of the public with the star, or whether it is the excellence or the private life of the star which is of more importance". He states that superstars' extravagant incomes play an important psychological "compensating mechanism" role for the public. According to Madow, "Fame is a 'relational' phenomenon, something that is conferred by others. A person can, within the limits of his natural talents, make himself strong or swift or learned. But he cannot, in this same sense, make himself famous, any more than he can make himself loved. [...] Fame is often conferred or withheld, just as love is, for reasons and on grounds other than 'merit'. This means that regardless of how strenuously the star may try to 'monitor' and 'shape' it, the media and the public always play a substantial part in the image-making process."

== Economics of "superstars" ==
In 1981, Sherwin Rosen examined the economics of superstars to determine why "relatively small numbers of people earn enormous amounts of money and seem to dominate the fields in which they engage" Rosen argues that, in superstar markets, "small differences in talent at the top of the distribution will translate into large differences in revenue". Rosen points out that "sellers of higher talent charge only slightly higher prices than those of lower talent, but sell much larger quantities; their greater earnings come overwhelmingly from selling larger quantities than from charging higher prices".

Microeconomist Alfred Marshall explains that technology has greatly extended the power and reach of the planet's most gifted performers. He referenced classical opera singer Elizabeth Billington, a well-acclaimed soprano with a strong voice who could only reach a small audience and naturally did not have access to a microphone or amplifier in 1798, let alone "MTV, CDs, iTunes, and Pandora". This limited her ability to dominate the market in the way that artists to do today. Marshall wrote, "So long as the number of persons who can be reached by a human voice is strictly limited, it is not very likely that any singer will make an advance on the £10,000 said to have been earned in a season by Mrs. Billington at the beginning of the last century, nearly as great [an increase] as that which the business leaders of the present generation have made on those of the last." Furthermore, the trends in popular music indicate that the price of the average concert ticket increased by nearly 400% from 1981 to 2012, much faster than the 150% rise in overall consumer price inflation.

Some scholars argue that superstardom plays a useful role in society. Caillois cites Rawls, who states that the "premiums earned by scarce natural talents serve to cover the costs of training and to encourage the efforts of learning, as well as to direct ability to where it best furthers the common interest". Cowen cites Rosen to argue that "the superstar effect is welfare-improving (consumers get better performances) even if it leads to raising income inequality" and adds that the "superstar phenomenon should not be overstressed [...] indeed, fame is a positive-sum game, not a negative nor a zero-sum one". Cowen states that "countervailing forces operate, such as a convergence of quality that limits the ability of the very best stars to dominate the market for long, or more radically the elastic supply of fame". This means that "when demand for fame increases, the numbers of prizes, rewards and whatever fame generating distinctions is rising too".

On the other hand, it has been argued that "compensation systems that resemble prizes [lotteries] can also create perverse incentives by discouraging cooperative behaviour and may encourage some contestants to disrupt the performance of competitors". As well, Frank and Cook (1995) called into question "the way the winner-take-all markets operate, with their damaging features". They argue that the "winner-take-all payoff structure [of competition for superstardom] generates a spiral of individual and social occupational waste, since it leads both to increasing (monetary and non-monetary) reward inequalities and to overcrowding in the markets and occupations prone to an overestimation of one's chance to succeed". As a result, they argue that "when excess numbers of contestants are induced to invest in performance enhancement in order to raise their individual odds of winning, these investments will be mutually offsetting and socially inefficient; end consumers may get more valuable products but the social costs are excessive".

== Other meanings ==
=== "Superstar" art museums ===
A small number of major art museums, including Frank Lloyd Wright's Guggenheim Museum, the Centre Pompidou, and Frank Gehry's Guggenheim Museum, have become household names and major tourist destinations. With their striking, architecturally designed buildings and well-known masterpieces, they have been termed "superstar" art museums. With their huge visitor traffic, superstar museums are often able to derive a significant income from museum bookshops and restaurants and have a "major impact on the local economy". Superstar museums are able to use the popular appeal of their location and art holdings to produce their own books, videos, and television specials, which adds an additional revenue stream and further reinforces the public's awareness of the museum. Some superstar museums have also begun establishing museum networks. For example, London's Tate Gallery launched the additional art museums Tate Liverpool and Tate St. Ives.

Cultural institutions such as art museums play a "gatekeeping" role for consumers, helping to screen and grade cultural artefacts and artworks, thus "reducing information and search costs" for consumers. Moreover, by channelling resources to a limited group of visual artists, cultural institutions also "enhance superstar phenomena within the visual arts".

=== Superstar CEOs ===
McGraw-Hill's economic website argues that the multimillion-dollar salaries of superstar CEOs in the corporate world can be viewed as a type of tournament prize. The huge salaries of these executives "often seem to resemble prizes for the winners of contests rather than compensation in return for the value of the marginal product of labour". As an example, a company may "have many vice-presidents of roughly comparable ability and the vice-president (who may only be slightly more talented than the others) that is promoted to president receives a huge salary increase, which resembles a prize for winning the contest as best VP". The article goes on to argue, "Such a compensation system may be efficient if the organization is only able to rank its executives according to the relative value of their contribution to the organization (the organization cannot measure the productivity of each executive, only the productivity of the group of executives). [...] Even if executives are paid a wage equal to the average productivity of the group, there will still be an incentive to perform in order be promoted and win the prize."

== See also ==
- Supercouple
