= Thomas White (cricketer, born c. 1740) =

English cricketer (c.1740–1831)

Thomas 'Daddy' White (c. 1740, probably in Surrey – 28 July 1831, Reigate) was an English cricketer who regularly played in historically important matches through the 1760s and 1770s. (Note: Any match listed in the ACS' Important Match Guide (1981) is historically important, and therefore of the highest standard, whether or not a scorecard might exist. The same applies to numerous matches discovered by researchers since 1981. For further information, see First-class cricket.) Details of his early career are largely unknown, and he retired in 1779. He is known to have appeared frequently for Surrey and England since recorded scorecards first became commonplace in 1772. A top-class player, he was a genuine all-rounder who was successful as both a batsman and a change bowler—his handedness and bowling style are unknown.

== Career ==
While playing, White lived at Reigate in Surrey. There has been confusion in some accounts, mainly that of John Nyren, between Thomas White himself and Shock White of Brentford, in Middlesex. The main cause of this confusion may have been the 'wide bat controversy', wherein, as John Nyren put it: '...a player, named White, of Ryegate (sic)...' tried to use a bat that was fully as wide as the wicket itself.

=== According to Nyren ===
The earliest reference to White is in fact his part in the 'wide bat controversy'; there is no mention of him in sources before 1771, when he was about 31 years old. Elsewhere in his book, Nyren includes White among the best four bowlers who played against Hambledon in the 1770s—the others were Lumpy Stevens, John Frame, and John Wood. Nyren described White as:

a good change (bowler), and a very decent hitter; but take him altogether, I never thought very highly of his playing

Nyren is notorious for not giving due credit to Hambledon's opponents. He added that White was a 'short, and rather stoutly made man'.

=== The wide bat controversy ===
There is no certainty, but the incident is generally believed to have occurred on 23–24 September 1771, when White was playing for Chertsey versus Hambledon at Laleham Burway.

Straight bats had replaced the old curved ones a few years earlier, in response to bowlers pitching the ball, instead of rolling or skimming it as formerly. With no agreed rule about the shape or size of a bat, the width issue may have been rankling, and White may have been forcing the issue. Although that cannot be confirmed as his actual motive, it is considered unlikely that it was a prank, or that he was seeking an unfair advantage. In any case, a written objection by Hambledon players Thomas Brett, Richard Nyren, and John Small has been preserved by Marylebone Cricket Club (MCC), and in the 1774 version of The Laws of Cricket, the maximum width of the bat was set at four and one quarter inches.

=== 1772 and 1773 ===
White became a prominent player from the 1772 season, in which he played in two matches for England against Hampshire at Broadhalfpenny Down and Bishopsbourne Paddock. He made England's top score of 35 in the first match. White followed 1772 with nine known appearances in the 1773 season.

== Bibliography ==
- ACS (1981). A Guide to Important Cricket Matches Played in the British Isles 1709–1863. Nottingham: ACS. OCLC 85045528.
- Mote, Ashley (1997). The Glory Days of Cricket. Robson. ISBN 978-18-61051-11-0.
- Nyren, John (1998) [1832]. Mote, Ashley (ed.). The Cricketers of my Time. London: Robson Publishing. ISBN 978-18-61051-68-4.
