= Bat-and-ball =

Bat-and-ball may refer to:

- Bat-and-ball games
- Bat & Ball Inn, Hambledon in Hampshire, England
- Bat & Ball railway station in Kent, England
- Turn and slip indicator
