= Richard Nyren =

English professional cricketer

Personal information
- Born: c. 25 April 1734; Eartham, Sussex
- Died: 25 April 1797
- Batting: Left-handed
- Bowling: Left-arm underarm
- Relatives: John Nyren (son)

Domestic team information
- Years: Team
- 1768–1786: Hampshire
- Source: CricketArchive, 18 December 2009

Richard Nyren (1734–1797) was an English professional cricketer who played during the heyday of the Hambledon Club. A genuine all-rounder and the earliest known left-hander of note, Nyren was the captain of Hampshire when its team included players like John Small, Thomas Brett and Tom Sueter. Although the records of many matches in which he almost certainly played have been lost, he made 51 known appearances between 1764 and 1784. He was known as the team's "general" on the field and, for a time, acted as the club secretary as well as taking care of matchday catering for many years.

== Cricket career ==
=== Early mentions ===
Nylan was living in Sussex in 1758, as he married that year at Slindon, and was not definitely resident at Hambledon until 1762. The first confirmed mention of him as a cricketer was in 1764 when he was named as captain of the Hambledon team that defeated Chertsey by 4 wickets at Laleham Burway on 10–11 September.

A number of Hambledon matches were played from 1764 to 1771 but team and performance information has been lost. Nyren was certainly active through this period but there are only two more definite mentions of him before the 1772 season, when the keeping of match scorecards became habitual. In 1769, he captained Hambledon at Guildford Bason against Caterham, Hambledon winning by 4 wickets.

On 23 and 24 September 1771, Nyren captained Hambledon against Chertsey at Laleham Burway in what has become known as the "big bat match". When Thomas Brett objected to the wide bat used by Chertsey's Thomas White, Nyren supported him and the Hambledon players effected a change in the Laws of Cricket, formally recognised in the 1774 code, to limit the width of the bat to four and one quarter inches.

=== 1772 to 1774 ===
An unusual feature of Nyren's career is that, in an age when given men were the norm rather than the exception in cricket teams, he was never recorded as playing for anyone other than Hambledon/Hampshire. The same applied to his bowling partner Thomas Brett. Scorecards began to be kept habitually from the 1772 season and Nyren was recorded in 48 important matches, plus some single wicket matches, from then until he retired in 1784.

In 1772, Nyren played for Hampshire at the Artillery Ground in a single wicket "fives" match against Kent, Kent winning by one wicket after Nyren had made the highest score in the match with 29. Hampshire then played three important matches which have surviving scorecards. Under Nyren's leadership, Hampshire won the first two of these against England at Broadhalfpenny Down and Guildford Bason but then, without Nyren, they lost the third match against Kent at Bishopsbourne Paddock by 2 wickets.

1773 was Hambledon's worst season. They played nine known matches in important matches (i.e., including one single wicket) and lost all of them, some by wide margins including two innings defeats. Nyren led the team in most of the matches, two of which have no surviving scorecard, but he missed the game against Surrey at Laleham Burway in September. Hampshire had better results in 1774 and twice defeated an England but were themselves beaten twice by Kent, a very strong team in the early 1770s. Nyren captained the team in all the games that have surviving scorecards, making 5 known appearances in all.

=== 1775 to 1777 ===
Nyren made four known appearances in 1775, but did not take part in one of the most famous matches in history. This was the single wicket "fives" game at the Artillery Ground when a Hambledon Five defeated a Kent Five by one wicket, the not out batsman being John Small who was beaten three times by Lumpy Stevens, only for the ball to go through the two-stump wicket without disturbing the bail. As a result of Lumpy's protests, the middle stump was legalised, though its introduction was gradual. However, Nyren did play against Surrey at Broadhalfpenny Down on 13 July and made his highest known score of 98, sharing a century partnership with Small for the 5th wicket and turning the match in Hampshire's favour. Small went on to make 136, the earliest century definitely recorded in an important match, and Hampshire eventually won by 296 runs having looked certain to lose before Nyren and Small came together. When Nyren was out, he was confronted by Hambledon stewards Charles Powlett and Philip Dehaney who had bet heavily against Hampshire when the match looked lost. They remonstrated that they would lose their money because of Nyren and Small, but Nyren told them he was glad and said: "Another time, don't bet your money against such men as we are". It may be added that Powlett was a Reverend and that both he and Dehaney had been on the committee which revised the Laws of Cricket only the previous year.

In 1776, Hampshire finally turned the tables on Kent, winning three and losing one of their four fixtures. Nyren took part in all 7 known important matches that Hampshire played this season. In the first game, he scored 70 and 19 against Kent at Sevenoaks Vine, Hampshire winning by 75 runs in a low-scoring match, so his runs made all the difference; he also bowled well, taking at least 3 wickets. Later in the season, in another match at Sevenoaks against England, Nyren and George Leer shared an unbeaten 5th wicket partnership of at least 50 to steer Hampshire to a six wicket victory. When Hampshire beat Surrey by 198 runs at Broadhalfpenny Down on 26 August, it was largely due to Nyren's bowling as he took 5 wickets (all bowled) in the first innings.

1777 was another great year for Hambledon with Hampshire playing England six times and winning four of them. At Sevenoaks Vine on 18, 19 and 20 June, Hampshire defeated England by an innings and 168 runs. James Aylward made the then record score in an individual innings with 167 as Hampshire amassed 403, a massive total in 18th century conditions. Among several sizeable partnerships he had was one with Nyren, who scored 37, for the 7th wicket. In August, Nyren had a good game with the ball, taking 4 wickets in the first innings, as Hampshire beat England by 1 wicket at Guildford Bason.

=== 1778 to 1784 ===
Nyren was about 44 when the 1778 season began and his appearances now decreased as he played in only 19 more matches from June 1778 until his last in June 1784. He was still capable of producing good performances, especially with the ball and took 4 England wickets in one innings at Itchin Stoke Down in July 1778. He bowled especially well in 1779, one of Hambledon's best seasons, when they won all four of their important matches, Nyren taking at least 16 wickets in the four matches (the scorecards of two games are incomplete). He had by now accepted that he was no longer an all-rounder and was batting at number 10 or 11 in every innings. He made only two known appearances in 1780 but continued to bowl well and took 5 wickets in one innings against Kent at Itchin Stoke Down. He was again taking good wickets in 1781 and 1782, especially in the low-scoring match against Kent at Bishopsbourne Paddock in August 1781 when he and Lamborn bowled Hampshire to an eight-run victory.

Nyren bowed out of cricket in 1784 just as, ominously for Hambledon, the White Conduit Club made its debut in important matches. The Hambledon membership was now in decline as the nobility began to seek a London venue for their cricketing activities and White Conduit was their initial attempt at establishing a metropolitan presence. Richard Nyren's final recorded appearance was in the England v Hampshire match at Sevenoaks Vine on 1 and 2 June 1784. England won convincingly by 7 wickets. Nyren scored 0 and 8, took one catch and no wickets.

== Style and technique ==
Nyren was left-handed as both batsman and bowler. He is the earliest of the left-handers listed in Scores & Biographies, others of his time being James Aylward, Tom Sueter, Noah Mann, Robert Clifford, Francis Booker, William Brazier and David Harris, although the latter bowled right-handed.

Nyren was a bowling all-rounder who was, with Thomas Brett, one of "the two principal bowlers" in the early Hambledon team. He bowled underarm at a fast-medium pace and "had a high delivery, always to the length, and his balls were provokingly deceitful".

Ashley-Cooper commented: "Perhaps of all the players who appeared for Hambledon (sic) only William Beldham surpassed him in excellence as an all-round performer – apart, that is, from captaincy". Nyren was widely recognised as the expert in all cricketing matters, and at Hambledon he was "the chosen general of all the matches, ordering and directing the whole". He was "uniformly consulted on all questions of (cricket) law or precedent" and his decision was always accepted. A significant example of this level of influence occurred in 1771, as described above, following the "big bat" controversy when Nyren, Brett and Small effectively changed the Laws of Cricket by setting the maximum bat width.

Nyren was a successful coach who worked with the young David Harris on his line and length, helping to make Harris into the most successful bowler of the 1780s. Harris had begun as a "raw countryman, deplorably addicted to bowling full tosses". So Nyren took him in hand and "preached to him the great principle of three-quarter (sic) or length bowling".

== Character ==
Often referred to as "The General" on the cricket field, Nyren seems to have been known among his familiars as Dick. He was "a very stout man" who was about five feet nine inches tall, but was "uncommonly active". He kept himself fit during the winter by "(devoting) much time to hunting, shooting and fishing".

Writing of his father, John Nyren says he "never saw a finer specimen of the thoroughbred old English yeoman than Richard Nyren", who was "a good face-to-face, unflinching, uncompromising, independent man". Nyren's response to Powlett and Dehaney in 1775 is consistent with this description. He would stand his ground even when disagreement arose with the major patrons John Frederick Sackville, 3rd Duke of Dorset, and Sir Horatio Mann. On one occasion, when Nyren had been proved right, Mann "crossed the ground and (shook) him heartily by the hand". Although, as Underdown points out, the Duke perhaps did not.

== Family and personal life ==
Nyren was a nephew of the noted Slindon players Richard, John and Adam Newland who coached him as a boy. Nyren was still living at Eartham in 1758 when he married Frances Pennicud at Slindon. He had moved to Hambledon from Sussex by 1762, when he became the landlord of a pub which was then called The Hut. Later, its name was changed to the Bat and Ball Inn; it is arguably the most famous pub with a cricketing connection and is still open for business immediately next to the Hambledon Club's ground at Broadhalfpenny Down. In 1772, Nyren took over the "more upmarket" George Inn which was in Hambledon village close to the church, his Hambledon colleague William Barber taking over at the Bat and Ball for the next 12 years. Nyren also maintained a small farm just outside Hambledon.

For many years, Nyren and Barber took charge of match day catering at both Broadhalfpenny Down and Windmill Down and Ashley-Cooper's Hambledon Cricket Chronicle reproduces an advertisement that appeared in the Hampshire Chronicle of 28 July 1777:

‘’Ladies and Gentlemen will find an excellent cold collation every day on the Down, at Nyren and Barber's booths‘’.

This advertisement must have been placed for a match that is now unknown as surviving records do not include any match on Broadhalfpenny Down in 1777 until September. On 22 June 1778, the Hampshire Chronicle advertised:

‘’NYREN (sic) has laid in a stock of excellent wines and cold provisions, and hopes the air of Stoke Down will, with the Ladies at least, stand in the place of Marbres, Aspiques, Blanc Manges, &c. For good appetite there will be a sufficient quantity of beef, ham, chicken and tarts‘’.

This advertisement was placed ahead of the Hampshire v England match at Itchin Stoke Down on 6 and 7 July 1778. Nyren took 4 wickets in the match but Hampshire lost by 45 runs.

Nyren was Secretary of the Hambledon Club for a time and one of his duties, apparently a thankless task, was to collect from members their subscriptions in arrears.

Nyren's son John (1764–1837) was the author of The Cricketers of My Time.

== Legacy ==
The success of Hambledon owed much to the co-operation of its subscribing members on one hand and the players on the other. Just as Nyren, supported by Small and others, was the principal figure in the team, the mainstays among the membership were the Reverend Charles Powlett, Philip Dehany and John Richards. After Nyren finished playing he became the club secretary, working closely with Richards who was the treasurer. They tried to keep things going in rural Hampshire but, as Ashley-Cooper points out in respect of Powlett, "found destiny too strong".

The end was in sight when Lord's was opened at Marylebone and several key patrons, including many Hambledon members, founded Marylebone Cricket Club. MCC immediately usurped Hambledon's position as the sport's lawgiver and became the principal club, while Lord's became the new focal point and feature venue within easy reach of the metropolis. Hambledon carried on for a few more seasons and Hampshire could still put a strong team in the field but "when Richard Nyren left Hambleton (sic) the club broke up, and never resumed from that day (for) the head and right arm were gone". This is a somewhat romantic view, written by Nyren's son. It is true that Richard Nyren left Hambledon for a time in 1791 and there was a party in his honour at the Bat and Ball in September of that year, but the club continued to function after that and Nyren still lived in Hambledon until 1796, the year in which the club's final minute read "No Gentlemen". The end came about not because Nyren left the club but because the membership moved to Marylebone.

Richard Nyren moved to Bromley-by-Bow in 1796 and died there on 25 April 1797.

== Bibliography ==
- Harry Altham, A History of Cricket, Volume 1 (to 1914), George Allen & Unwin, 1926.
- F. S. Ashley-Cooper, The Hambledon Cricket Chronicle, Herbert Jenkins, 1924.
- G. B. Buckley, Fresh Light on 18th Century Cricket, Cotterell, 1935.
- Arthur Haygarth, Scores & Biographies, Volume 1 (1744–1826), Lillywhite, 1862.
- Ashley Mote, The Glory Days of Cricket, Robson, 1997.
- John Nyren, The Cricketers of my Time (ed. Ashley Mote), Robson, 1998.
- David Underdown, Start of Play, Allen Lane, 2000.
- H. T. Waghorn, The Dawn of Cricket, Electric Press, 1906.
- Martin Wilson, An Index to Waghorn, Bodyline, 2005.
