= John Small (cricketer) =

English cricketer

Personal information
- Born: 19 April 1737; Empshott, Hampshire
- Died: 31 December 1826 (aged 89); Petersfield, Hampshire
- Batting: Right-handed
- Role: Batter

Domestic team information
- Years: Team
- 1768–1798: Hampshire

John Small (19 April 1737 – 31 December 1826) was an English professional cricketer who played during the 18th century and had one of the longest careers on record. Born at Empshott, Hampshire, he is generally regarded as the greatest batsman of the 18th century and acknowledged as having been the first to master the use of the modern straight bat which was introduced in the 1760s. He probably scored the earliest known century in important cricket. He died at Petersfield, where he was in residence for most of his life, and where he established businesses.

Small was a very influential player who was involved in the creation of two significant permanent additions to the Laws of Cricket: the maximum width of the bat and the introduction of the middle stump (out of the three stumps) of the wicket either end of the cricket pitch. Acclaimed as the greatest player associated with the famous Hambledon Club, Small is the first person known to have been described in literature in terms that attest him to have been a "superstar". In 1997, he was named by The Times as one of its 100 Greatest Cricketers of All Time.

== Cricket career ==
Small was a playing member of Hambledon during its years of greatness. He was definitely playing for Hambledon by 1764 and his name is found in the club's scorecards until 1798 when he was over 60. Knowledge of the early years of his career are sketchy due to the lack of detailed records before scorecards became common from 1772, but it is believed he began playing in the 1750s, and may well have taken part in the earliest known Hambledon matches, a tri-series against Dartford in 1756.

=== 1764–1771 ===
The earliest definite mention of Small dates from the 1764 season when Hambledon played three matches against Chertsey.

In August 1768, Small scored more than 140 runs for Hambledon against Kent at Broadhalfpenny Down. This was a feat almost unheard of at that time but it is not quite clear from the original source if it was in one innings or his match total. Only a week later, playing for Hambledon against Sussex at Broadhalfpenny Down, Small scored "about four-score notches ... and was not out when the game was finished", Hambledon winning by 7 wickets.

In 1769, Hambledon played Caterham at Guildford Bason and won by 4 wickets. A contemporary report in the Reading Mercury states that "the utmost activity and skill in the game was displayed by each individual through the whole course of this match, but particularly the batting of Messrs Small and John Bayton on the Hambledon team".

Small was involved in one of the most controversial incidents in early cricket history when Hambledon played Chertsey at Laleham Burway in September 1771. Hambledon won the match by 1 wicket. It was in this game that Chertsey's Thomas White used a bat that was as wide as the wicket, possibly in an attempt to force an issue about the width of the new straight bats that had recently replaced the old curved sticks. Whether that was White's intention is unclear but his action ensured that a new rule was passed which limited the width to 4.25 inches. This rule supported a written motion presented by Hambledon bowler Thomas Brett that was counter-signed by club captain Richard Nyren and senior batsman Small. The original of Brett's memorandum, bearing Small's signature, is maintained by Marylebone Cricket Club in its museum at Lord's.

=== 1772–1775 ===
The production of match scorecards became common from the 1772 season and three 1772 cards have survived. Small played in all three matches and was easily the season's highest runscorer with 213 in his six innings. The only other player to exceed 100 was William Yalden who made 136, also in six innings. In the first match of the season, Small scored 78 for Hampshire against England out of a team total of 146. In the second innings, he scored 34 out of 79 and his team won by 53 runs, an illustration of his enormous value to Hampshire. His innings of 78 was the highest individual score definitely recorded to that time. Although higher scores such as Richard Newland's 88 in 1745 and Small's own 140-plus in 1768 have been mentioned in the sources, it is not clear if those were definitely made in one innings or if they were match totals.

Small's 1772 aggregate of 213 runs from six innings would give him an average of 35.50 if all his innings were completed (scorecards in 1772 do not confirm the not out batsmen). This may seem low by modern standards but scores were much lower in general at the time.

Small has been recorded in a number of single wicket matches, but he seems to have been less successful in this form of cricket than in the eleven-a-side version. On 22–23 May 1775, he played in one single wicket innings that was of enormous significance in the evolution of the sport because it led directly to the introduction of the third (middle) stump to what had always been a two-stump wicket. This was the single wicket "fives" game at the Artillery Ground when a Hambledon Five defeated a Kent Five by one wicket, the not out batsman being Small who in the course of his second innings was beaten three times by Lumpy Stevens, only for the ball to pass through the two-stump wicket each time without hitting the stumps or the bail. As a result of Lumpy's protests, the middle stump was legalised and introduced, although its introduction was gradual.

Small's most famous feat was scoring the earliest known century in an important match when he made 136 not out for Hampshire against Surrey at Broadhalfpenny Down in July 1775. This beat John Minshull's score of 107 set in 1769. It lasted only until 1777 when James Aylward set a new mark with a score of 167. Small scored this century in the 5th wicket turned the match in Hampshire's favour, and they eventually won by 296 runs after having looked certain to lose before Small and Richard Nyren came together.

== Style and technique ==
Along with other greats of the Hambledon era such as Billy Beldham and Tom Walker, Small did much to lay the foundations of what can now be recognised as modern batting technique. He was noted for his sound defence, but he was also a fluent strokemaker who used his wrists particularly well. John Nyren described him as the "best short runner of his day", and believed him to be "the first who turned the short run to account".

Small rarely bowled but was "an admirable fieldsman, always playing middle wicket", and "as active as a hare".

It is sometimes said that Small invented the straight bat, replacing the old curved bat in the 1760s after bowlers started pitching the ball instead of skimming or trundling it. It is more accurate to say that he was the first batsman to master the use of the straight bat, and that he subsequently manufactured them in his workshop.

== Family and personal life ==
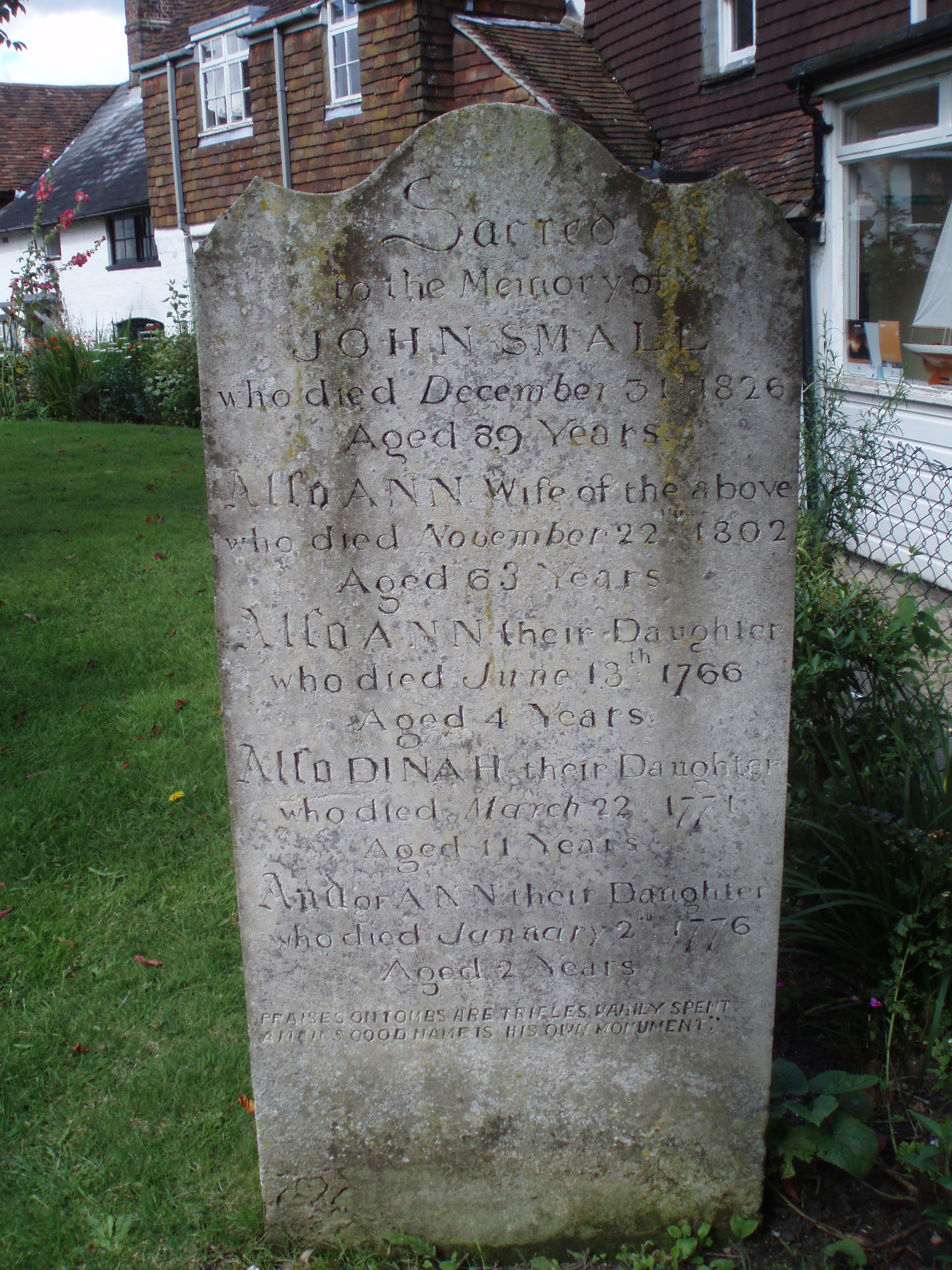
John Small's tombstone in the churchyard at St Peter's Church, Petersfield.

Nyren says that Small was "a remarkably well-made and well-knit man of a handsome countenance and honest expression".

He was married and had at least five children including three daughters who died in childhood (see photograph of the family's tombstone). His wife Ann (born c.1739) died on 22 November 1802, aged 63. His two sons, Jack and Eli, also played senior cricket. Mrs Ann Small was a vociferous supporter of the Hambledon team and was a regular attendee at its matches, often travelling with the team to away games too.

Outside cricket, Small's profession was originally a cobbler but he later expanded his business to include the manufacture of cricket bats and balls.

Small was musical and could play both the fiddle and the double bass. One of his greatest admirers was the cricket patron John Sackville, 3rd Duke of Dorset, who, when learning of Small's musical skills, sent him "a handsome violin". Small returned the favour by sending the Duke a present of two newly made cricket bats and balls.

== Legacy ==
Like so many of his contemporaries, Small's fame is based largely on the testimony paid to him by John Nyren in The Cricketers of My Time. Small received high praise indeed for Nyren wrote that "(Small) shines among them (i.e., the Hambledon players) in all the lustre of a star of the first magnitude" (i.e., a superstar).

His legacy is well summarised by a contemporary verse about him which, it is believed, he displayed on a sign outside his workshop in Petersfield:

Here lives John Small,
Makes bat and ball,
Pitches a wicket, plays at cricket
With any man in England.

Writing in 1900, F. S. Ashley-Cooper said in his introduction to At the Sign of the Wicket that the best 18th century players "possessed that amount of genius which would make them excellent players in any age". He named Small, John Frame, David Harris, and Richard Newland as examples.

In 1997, in an article in The Times, former Wisden Cricketers' Almanack editor John Woodcock named Small in his 100 Greatest Cricketers of All Time.

== Bibliography ==
- Ashley-Cooper, F. S. (1924). Hambledon Cricket Chronicle: 1772–1796. London: Jenkins. OCLC 38498574.
- Buckley, G. B. (1935). Fresh Light on 18th Century Cricket. Birmingham: Cotterell & Co. OCLC 23450280.
- Haygarth, Arthur (1996) [1862]. Scores & Biographies, Volume 1 (1744–1826). Kennington: Frederick Lillywhite. ISBN 978-19-00592-23-9.
- McCann, Tim (2004). Sussex Cricket in the Eighteenth Century (PDF). Vol. 88. Lewes: West Sussex Record Office. ISBN 978-08-54450-55-8.
- Mote, Ashley (1997). The Glory Days of Cricket. Robson. ISBN 978-1-8610-5111-0.
- Nyren, John (1998) [1832]. Mote, Ashley (ed.). The Cricketers of my Time. London: Robson Publishing. ISBN 978-18-61051-68-4.
- Waghorn, H. T. (1899). Cricket Scores, Notes, &c. From 1730–1773. Edinburgh: Blackwood. OCLC 1086375331.
- Waghorn, H. T. (2005) [1906]. The Dawn of Cricket. London: J. W. McKenzie. ISBN 978-09-47821-17-3.
