= Constantine Phillips =

English cricketer

Constantine "Con" Phillips (1746 – 14 February 1811) was a professional cricketer who played for Surrey in the 1760s and 1770s until 1778.

Phillips was born and died in Chelsham, Surrey, and was christened 2 November 1746. Most of his career took place before cricket's statistical record began with regular scorecards in 1772. He made five known appearances in important matches between 1773 and 1778.

Phillips was primarily a batsman who scored a known total of 117 runs in 10 innings with a highest score of 31. He has not been credited with any wickets. He took just 1 catch, which suggests he may have been an outfielder.
