= Richard Francis (cricketer) =

English cricketer

Richard Francis (dates unknown) was an English cricketer who played in the last quarter of the 18th century. He played mainly for Hampshire although is known to have been born in Surrey and played for Surrey before moving to Hampshire. Later he moved to Essex and is known to have played for a variety of teams. He made 47 known appearances between 1773 and 1793.
