= William Barber (Hambledon cricketer) =

English cricketer

William Barber (1734–1805) was an English cricketer who played for the Hambledon Club in its great days during the 1760s and 1770s. Originally from Walberton, near Chichester, he came to Hambledon to play after being "spotted".

Barber finished playing in 1777. He is said to have bowled a "high delivery on a good length" and was probably a medium quick bowler.

His family and that of Thomas Brett were inter-married. Barber seems to have been a shoemaker but he latterly took over the Bat and Ball Inn (see also Broadhalfpenny Down) from Richard Nyren. He died aged 71 in 1805 and was buried in Catherington.
