= John Nyren =

English cricketer and author

John Nyren (15 December 1764 – 30 June 1837) was an English cricketer and author. Nyren made 16 known appearances from 1787 to 1817. He achieved lasting fame as the author of The Cricketers of My Time, which was first published in 1832 as a serial in a periodical called The Town and was then included in The Young Cricketer's Tutor, published in 1833 by Effingham Wilson of London. Nyren's collaborator in the work was Charles Cowden Clarke.

== Family and background ==
Nyren was the son of Richard Nyren, the captain of the Hambledon Club in its "glory days". He was brought up in the Bat and Ball Inn, where his father was the landlord, immediately opposite Broadhalfpenny Down, about a mile from Hambledon village where he was born.

== Cricket career ==
Nyren, who was a left-handed batsman and left-handed fieldsman, played for the Hambledon Club from 1778 until 1791. He was described as "standing nearly 6 ft, of large proportions throughout, big-boned, strong and active". He is first recorded in 1787, around the time his father retired from the game, and he played occasionally until 1817. He played for the Gentlemen in the inaugural and second Gentlemen v Players matches in 1806. Although he was a fine fieldsman, his playing career was not distinguished and he would now be remembered only as the son of a famous father if he had not turned his hand to literature in his old age.

== Writing career ==
In 1832, Nyren was living in London when he began his collaboration with Cowden Clarke, who recorded Nyren's reminiscences of the Hambledon era and published them serially in The Town as The Cricketers of My Time. The following year, the series with some modifications appeared as part of an instructional book entitled The Young Cricketer's Tutor. It became a major source for the history and personalities of Georgian cricket and also came to be regarded as the first classic in cricket's now rich literary history.

== Personal life ==
As well as being a devotee of cricket, Nyren was a talented musician who played the violin and composed music. Some of his compositions were published by Vincent Novello, who was a close friend. For 13 years Nyren was the choir master at St Mary's, Moorfields, where Novello was the organist.

Nyren married Cleopha Copp, aged 17, in 1791. They had two sons and five daughters, as well as two children who died in infancy. They lived first in Portsea, then in 1796 they moved to Bromley in Kent, and later lived in Battersea, London, then Cheyne Walk, Chelsea, and finally moved back to Bromley to live in Bromley Palace, where Nyren died.

== Bibliography ==
- H S Altham, A History of Cricket, Volume 1 (to 1914), George Allen & Unwin, 1962
- Ashley Mote: The Glory Days of Cricket, Robson, 1997
- John Nyren, The Cricketers of my Time (ed. Ashley Mote), Robson, 1998
