= Ashley Mote =

British politician (1936–2020)

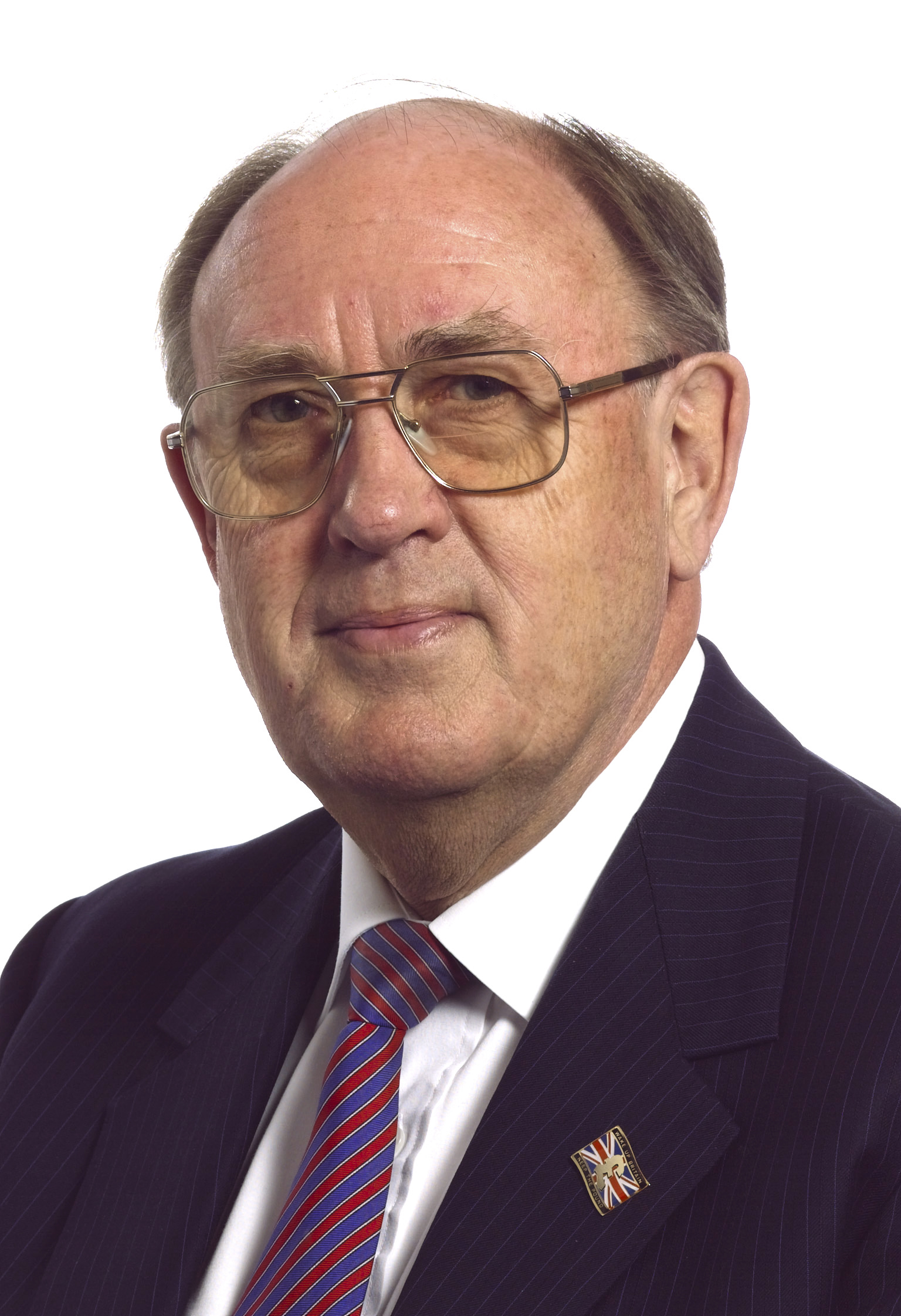

Member of the European Parliament for South East England
- In office 10 June 2004 – 4 June 2009
- Preceded by: Roy Perry
- Succeeded by: Marta Andreasen

Personal details
- Born: 25 January 1936 London, England
- Died: 30 March 2020 (aged 84)
- Party: Independent
- Other political affiliations: UK Independence Party (until July 2004)

Ashley Mote (25 January 1936 – 30 March 2020) was a British politician who was a member of the European Parliament (MEP) for South East England from 2004 to 2009. Elected representing the UK Independence Party, he became a non-inscrit one month into his term after UKIP suspended him due to investigation into his expenses.

A vociferous critic of fraud in the European Institutions, he himself was convicted of benefit fraud in 2007 for which he served a nine-month prison sentence and was described by the trial judge as "a truly dishonest man". The scandal ignited a debate as to how an MEP could receive a prison sentence, yet keep his seat in the European Parliament. In 2015, Mote was jailed for a further five years for fraudulently claiming nearly £500,000 in European Parliament expenses.

== Early career ==
Ashley Mote was born in London. He was educated at the City of London Freemen's School. Married with two children, Mote was a management consultant who ran a marketing business in Woking, Surrey, employing thirteen full-time staff, for eighteen years before it closed in 1989 as a result of the late 1980s recession.

Mote later became an author, publishing several titles on right-wing politics and also on cricket. His books have included Vigilance - A Defence of British Liberty (2001) about the European Union, and OverCrowded Britain: Our Immigration Crisis. His books on cricket are The Glory Days of Cricket (1997) which won The Cricket Society's "Cricket Book of the Year" award in 1997 and a new edition in 1998 of John Nyren's classic collection of articles on the Georgian game, The Cricketers of My Time (1833). Mote was also the first president of the revived Hambledon Club which raises money for colts cricket.

== European Parliament ==
In June 2004, Mote was elected to the European Parliament as a representative of the UK Independence Party (UKIP) for the South East England constituency, after campaigning to clean up sleaze in Brussels.

After being charged with fraud, Mote had the UKIP whip withdrawn from him pending his trial and became a non-attached MEP. In 2005, he joined Hans-Peter Martin and Paul van Buitenen in a loose political group called "Platform for Transparency" which promoted accountability in the European Union. In 2006, he gave evidence to the House of Lords enquiry into the EU's financial management of public funds. In 2007, he transferred his allegiance to the new far-right group Identity, Tradition and Sovereignty, whose members included Jean-Marie Le Pen and Alessandra Mussolini. The group was dissolved on 14 November 2007. During much of 2007 Mote was in prison in England, having been found guilty of fraud, after his attempts to claim immunity as a member of the European Parliament had proved unsuccessful. He was able to remain an MEP both during and after his months in prison.

In 2008, Mote published J'Accuse...!, an anti-EU pamphlet in which he claimed that immigrants were eight times more likely to commit crime than non-immigrant people. According to Mote, "Jamaican Yardies are selling crack cocaine in Hereford and Cambridgeshire, Chinese Snakeheads are operating in Lancashire and Norfolk, Albanians are running prostitution in Hampshire, Colombians control a cocaine network in Essex."

On 9 May 2009, Mote announced he would not stand as a candidate at the 2009 European Parliament election.

== Benefits fraud conviction ==
=== Proceedings begin ===
In 2004, the Department for Work and Pensions brought criminal charges against Mote for allegedly claiming £32,000 in income support and £35,000 in housing benefit from Chichester District Council over a six-year period without declaring his monthly earnings of £4,000. Mote was committed for trial at Chichester Crown Court on 27 April 2004. He would face nine charges of false accounting and one charge of making a false representation. On 16 June, at a plea and directions hearing, he pleaded not guilty to the charges and a trial date was fixed for 15 November. The following month, the UK Independence Party withdrew the whip from Mote on 15 July 2004 after learning from an article in The Daily Telegraph that he faced trial; Mote had failed to inform his party of the impending charges.

=== Application for immunity ===
On 4 October 2004, Mote sought to claim immunity from prosecution on the basis of his status as an MEP. His application was heard by Judge Aikens at Lewes Crown Court. He held that Chichester Crown Court was obliged to stay proceedings until the European Parliament had exercised its right to waive immunity. On 3 February 2005, the Attorney General applied to the Parliament whose Committee on Legal Affairs unanimously granted the waiver on 20 June and gave its approval to proceedings continuing in England.

On 5 April 2005, Mote appealed the Parliament's decision to the Court of First Instance (CFI). He gave no notice of his application to the Attorney General, nor to Judge Aikens at Lewes Crown Court, meaning that the British Government was unable to intervene in the case. Mote later applied on 15 December 2006 to the CFI for an interim order suspending the Parliament's decision pending the outcome of their decision. This was rejected on the basis that the condition of urgency was not satisfied.

Following the Parliament's waiver, the Attorney General applied to lift the stay imposed by Judge Aikens. The application was heard by Judge Gross on 17 October 2006 who granted the application, ruling that the desirability of proceeding with the trial outweighed any potential injustice to Mote that might result if the CFI were to annul the decision of the European Parliament to grant a waiver.

=== Trial ===
The case returned to England and a further 16 counts of fraud were added to Mote's original indictment. He complained once again to the European Parliament on 4 May 2007 that this constituted a "contempt", but the Parliament remarked that he had no immunity to defend and took no action. A second application was made to the CFI for interim measures, but this was also rejected.

A four-week trial commenced at Portsmouth Crown Court in July 2007; proceedings against Mote were led by government lawyers who had taken over the case from Chichester District Council in late 2005. The court heard that Mote had claimed housing and council tax benefits between 1991 and 1993 following the collapse of his business. He began to claim benefits again from 1996 but failed to declare income from various enterprises including a cleaning company and gambling on the currency markets.

In total, Mote spent just short of £73,000 between 20 February 1996 and 29 September 2002 to fund a "luxury lifestyle", regularly dining out and holidaying in France, The Caribbean and the United States. He was also accused of pocketing "substantial sums" through his interests in two firms. Joanna Greenberg QC, prosecuting, said that from 1996, Mote had filled out benefit claim forms stating that he was unemployed and had no financial assets, even though at the time he had business interests in an international marketing firm called Tanner Management and another company, JC Commercial Management.

=== Conviction ===
On 17 August 2007 Mote was found guilty by a jury of 21 charges of deception by falsely claiming £65,506 in benefits, and acquitted of a further four charges. Judge Richard Price warned him to expect a custodial sentence, but allowed bail on condition that Mote surrendered his British and diplomatic passports, as well as providing £50,000 in sureties.

He was sentenced on 31 August to nine months imprisonment to be served in Ford open prison, West Sussex. During sentencing, Judge Price said that Mote, "a truly dishonest man", had executed a "carefully planned scheme of dishonesty" and had taken "a great deal of trouble to cover [his] tracks", adding that "[t]o say that this case has ruined you is an understatement, it is a tragedy."

Mote's defence counsel described his client as a Walter Mitty character and admitted that the sentence was a "massive fall from grace". Mote applied for the third time to the CFI for relief against the impending imprisonment, highlighting the urgent nature of his request. This was also rejected by the CFI on 22 November 2007.

Reacting to the sentence, the leader of the UK Independence Party, Nigel Farage, said he was "disgusted and horrified" at the leniency of the sentence. If Mote had been jailed for more than one year, he would have lost his seat in the European Parliament, which could have been reassigned to another representative. Farage added that if "Mote had a shred of integrity left, he'd resign."

Mote was released from prison in November 2007 under the Government's tagging scheme.

=== Appeal ===
Mote appealed the decision of Portsmouth Crown Court to the Court of Appeal on two main grounds. First, that he had applied to the European Court of Justice to have his immunity as an MEP upheld and that it was an abuse of process for the Crown Court not to have suspended the case pending its decision. Second, that the fact the jury had convicted him on 21 counts of fraud and acquitted him on 4 counts was inconsistent. Giving his judgment, the Lord Chief Justice, Lord Phillips of Worth Matravers, stated that Portsmouth Crown Court had correctly decided that there was no need to wait for the CFI's decision, noting in any case that it was unlikely the CFI would differ in its final judgment from the decision of the European Parliament. On the second ground of appeal, the Court did, however, quash one of the counts of fraud - that of failing to notify.

The CFI handed down its decision on 15 October 2008. Mote had argued that the European Parliament had incorrectly interpreted Article 8 of the Protocol on the Privileges and Immunities of the European Communities concerning the immunity from prosecution of MEPs, that the Parliament should not have expressed an opinion on the merits of his fraud prosecution and that the decision to waive his immunity was "unreasonable and disproportionate", inadequately reasoned and taken without full consideration of the facts and arguments he had put forward. These arguments were all rejected by the Court, which ordered him to pay the Parliament's legal costs.

=== Repayment of benefits ===
The decision of Chichester District Council finding that benefits had been overpaid to Mote had been challenged by him before the Social Security Appeal Tribunal. The appeals were pending at the time Mote was committed for trial at the Crown Court, and were heard on 3 September 2004, although Mote was not present. The Tribunal dismissed the appeals, and Mote appealed to the Social Security Commissioners who dismissed his action on 20 July 2006. The Court of Appeal agreed to hear a further appeal and Mote argued that the Social Security Appeal Tribunal should have adjourned the case pending the outcome of Mote's criminal proceedings. This was rejected by the Court which held that the continuation of the proceedings did not constitute a breach of Mote's human rights.

As a result of the decision, Mote was obliged to repay £67,000 of the falsely claimed benefits.

== Catalyst for change in the law ==
Sarah Ludford MEP called for the British Government to change the law in the wake of the Mote case, stating that the European Parliament had been powerless to intervene in the case as Mote's eligibility as an MEP was solely a question of UK law. She expressed the sentiment that "MEPs are deeply unhappy at our inability to chuck out Mr Mote." The Commons Leader Harriet Harman shared these concerns and said that she was "in discussions regarding how we might explore options for reviewing the legislation", adding that "[t]he aim of this would be to ensure that, in future, the salaries of MPs and MEPs who are in prison would not be paid on the basis that they are not actually carrying out all their functions."

== Expenses fraud conviction ==
In 2015, Mote was jailed for five years by a British court for fraudulently claiming nearly £500,000 in European Parliament expenses. He died on 30 March 2020, at the age of 84.

== See also ==
- Benefit fraud

== Bibliography ==
- Mote, Ashley, The Glory Days of Cricket: the Extraordinary Story of Broadhalfpenny Down, 1997, Robson Books Limited (winner of the Cricket Society's 1997 Cricket Book of the Year prize).
- Mote, Ashley, (ed.) John Nyren's Cricketers of my Time, the Original Version, 1998, Robson Books Limited (the full original text with introduction and explanatory footnotes by the editor).
