= Hambledon, Hampshire =

Village and parish in Hampshire, England

Coordinates: 50.9307°N 1.0799°W

Hambledon
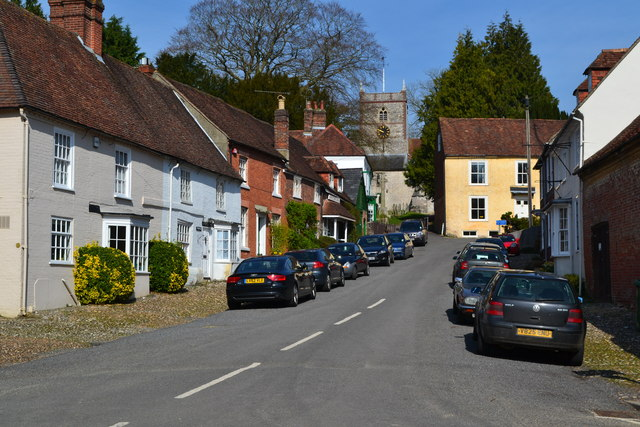
- High Street, Hambledon, Hampshire

- Location within Hampshire
- Population: 947 (2001 census); 962 (2011 Census)
- OS grid reference: SU646150
- Civil parish: Hambledon
- District: City of Winchester
- Shire county: Hampshire
- Region: South East
- Country: England
- Sovereign state: United Kingdom
- Post town: Waterlooville
- Postcode district: PO7
- Dialling code: 023
- Police: Hampshire and Isle of Wight
- Fire: Hampshire and Isle of Wight
- Ambulance: South Central
- UK Parliament: Winchester

Hambledon is a small village and civil parish in the county of Hampshire in England, situated about 10 miles (16 km) north of Portsmouth within the South Downs National Park.

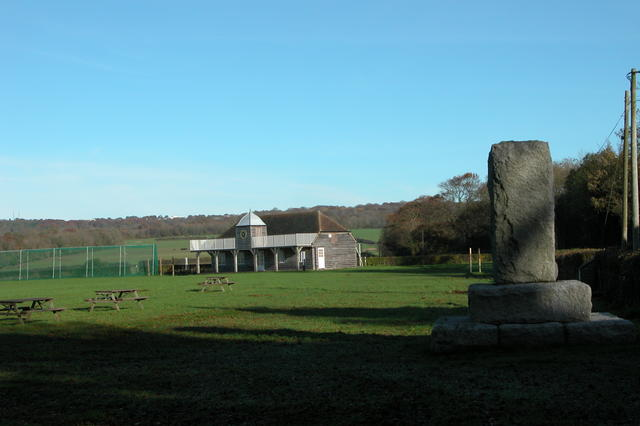
Broadhalfpenny Down

Hambledon is best known as the 'Cradle of Cricket'. It is thought that Hambledon Club, one of the oldest cricket clubs known, was formed about 1750. Hambledon was England's leading cricket club from about 1765 until the formation of MCC (Marylebone Cricket Club) in 1787.

The famous Bat and Ball Inn in Hyden Farm Lane is next to the historic cricket ground at Broadhalfpenny Down where the Hambledon club originally played. The inn was run by Richard Nyren, who was also captain of the club. The modern Hambledon Cricket Club's ground is at Ridge Meadow, about 0.5 miles (800 m) away.

Hambledon is a rural village surrounded by fields and woods. There are about 400 households with just under 1,000 residents. The hamlet of Chidden, 2 miles (3.2 km) north of Hambledon, is in the parish. The nearest villages are Clanfield, Denmead and Soberton.

Due to the climate and location Hambledon also has its very own vineyard, producing its own wine.

== History ==
Hambledon appears in the Domesday Survey of 1086 as a manor with a mill. From 1199 to 1869, the manor of Hambledon was awarded by the monarch to the Bishop of Winchester, entitling him to the tithes and other income from the parish. During the Commonwealth, the manor was passed to the Commonwealth supporter, George Wither until the Stuart Restoration.

The parish of Hambledon also included the manors of Burwell, Denmead, Glidden and Rushmere.

== Education ==
There is a school, Hambledon Primary School, recently rated as 'Outstanding' by Ofsted.

== Religious buildings ==
The parish church, St Peter's and St Paul's, has elements that date back to the Saxon period. The church was significantly expanded in the 13th century and a tower was added. The tower was rebuilt at the start of the 17th century and most recently in 1794. The church underwent a restoration in the 1870s. Admiral Sir Erasmus Gower, governor of Newfoundland, is buried in the church. The regimental colours of the Hambledon Volunteers during the Napoleonic Wars hang over the south aisle. The Georgian old Vicarage is Grade II listed and noted for its fine Dutch gables.

There is also a Victorian church at Denmead, built in 1880 in medieval style.

== Notable residents ==
The cricketer Richard Nyren played in Hambledon. Hambledon is the place of birth and death of William Lashly (1867–1940), a member of Robert Falcon Scott's Antarctic expeditions. It is also the home of Sir Guy Salisbury-Jones (1896–1985), an Army general and viticulturalist, who founded the vineyard.
