= Bat & Ball Inn, Hambledon =

Pub in Hambledon, Hampshire, England

Coordinates: 50.944767°N 1.036948°W

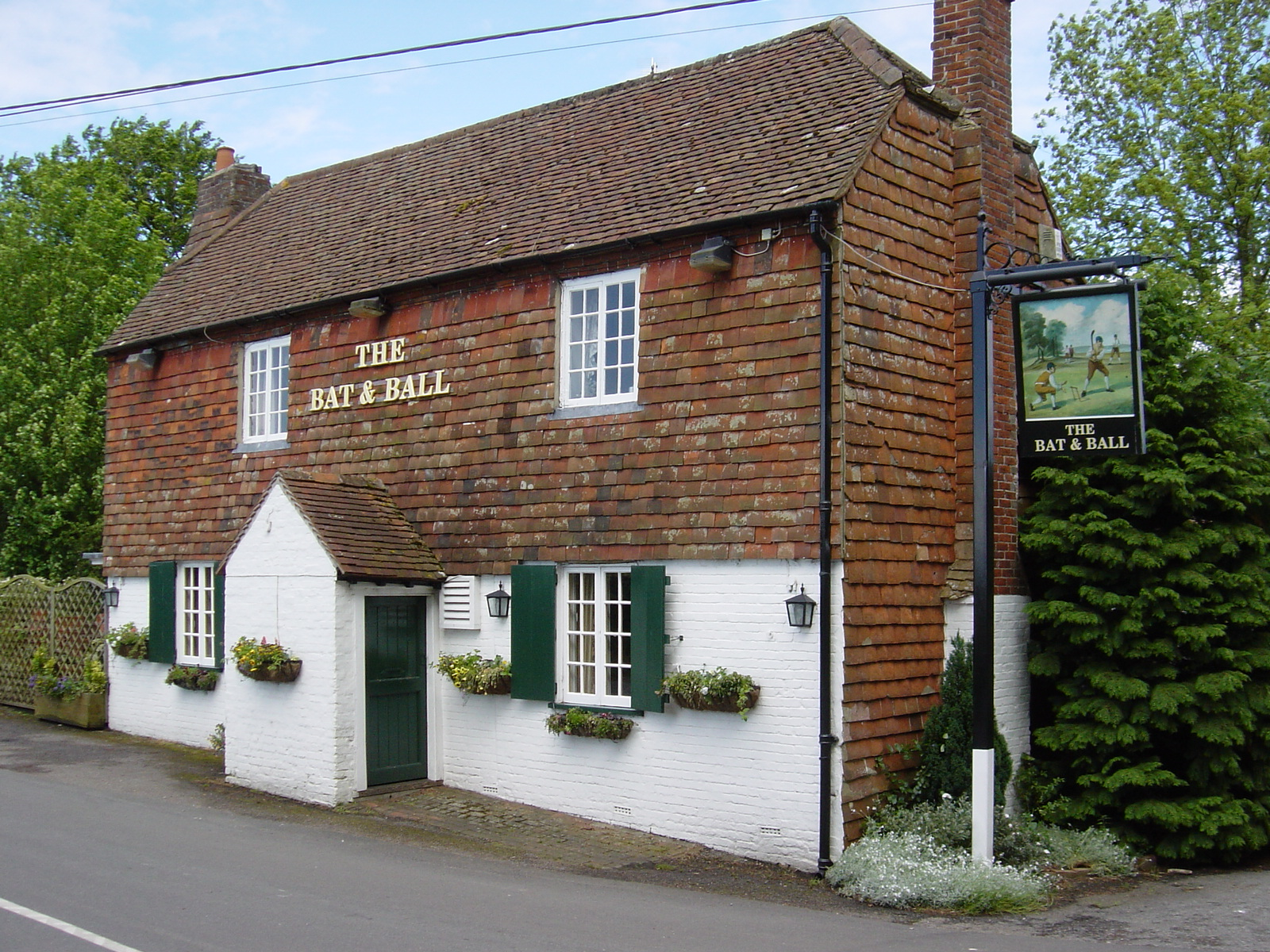
The Bat and Ball Inn at Broadhalfpenny Down

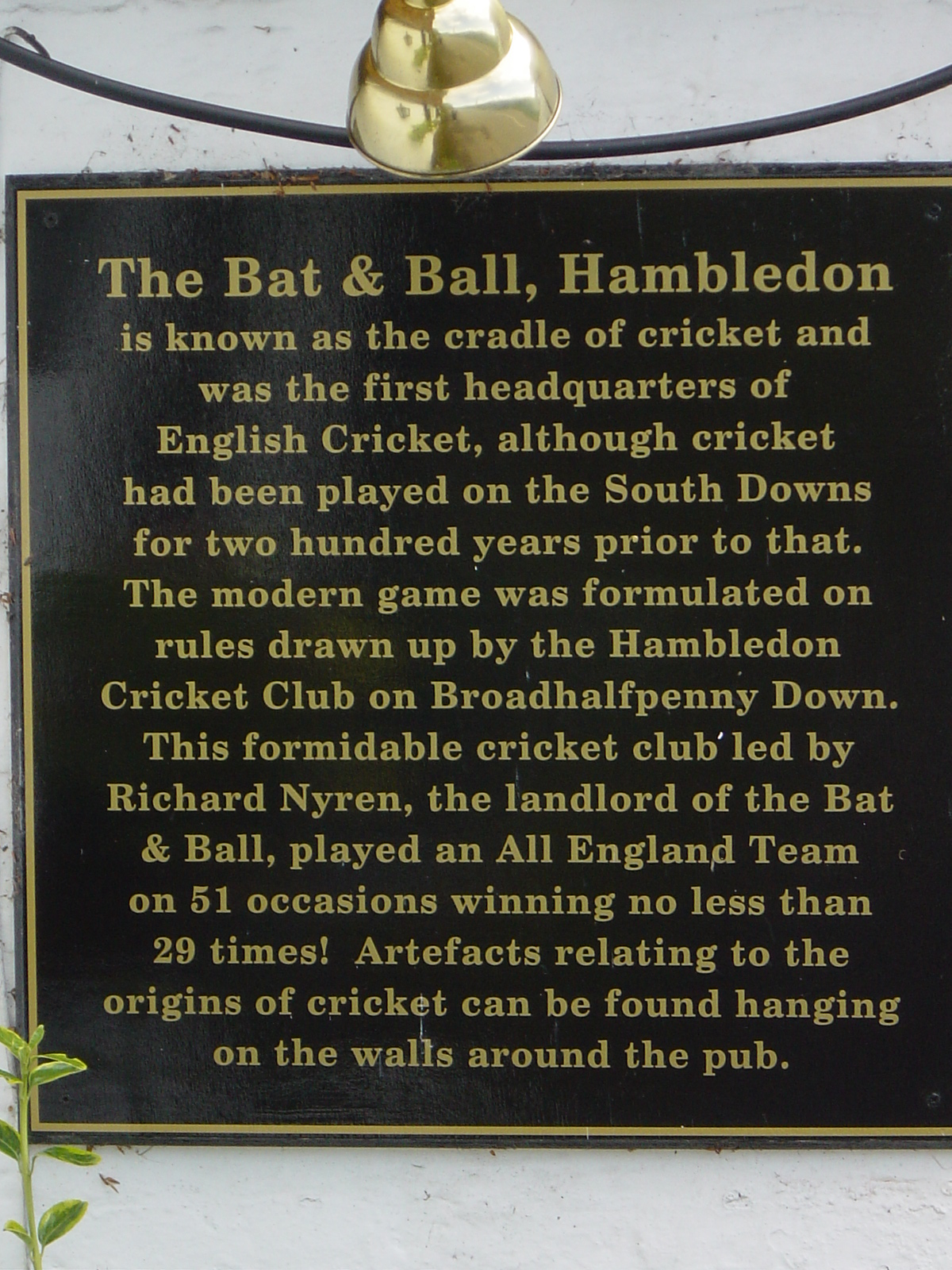
Sign on the wall of the Bat and Ball Inn

The Bat & Ball Inn is a historic eighteenth-century pub near Clanfield, Hampshire, England.

== History ==
The pub is situated opposite the Broadhalfpenny Down cricket ground, the original home of the Hambledon Club. Richard Nyren, a landlord of the inn from 1762 to 1772, was the Hambledon Club's team captain. Nyren was succeeded as landlord by William Barber, another well-known Hambledon cricketer, who held the licence until 1784.

The Monarch's Way long-distance footpath passes the pub.

The pub is currently owned by Fuller's and is a former George Gale and Co Ltd pub. The pub has been Grade II listed since 1954.

== Bibliography ==
- F S Ashley-Cooper, The Hambledon Cricket Chronicle, Herbert Jenkins, 1924
- David Underdown, Start of Play, Allen Lane, 2000
