= Hambledon Club =

Historical English cricket team

Team information
- Established: c.1765
- Last match: c.1796
- Home venue: Broadhalfpenny Down; Windmill Down

History
- Notable players: John Small; Richard Nyren; Thomas Brett; Tom Taylor; David Harris; Billy Beldham; Tom Walker; William Hogsflesh; William Barber

The Hambledon Club was a social club that is famous for its organisation of 18th century cricket matches. By the late 1770s it was the foremost cricket club in England.

== Foundation ==
The origin of the club, based near Hambledon in rural Hampshire, is unclear but it had certainly been founded by 1768.

Its basis was a local parish cricket team that was in existence before 1750 and achieved prominence in 1756 when it played a series of three matches versus Dartford, which had itself been a major club for at least 30 years. At this time, the parish team was sometimes referred to as "Squire Land's Club", after Squire Thomas Land who was apparently the main organiser of cricket teams in the village before the foundation of the club proper.

=== Thomas Land ===
Thomas Land (1714 – 18 June 1791) seems to have withdrawn from the scene in about 1764. It is believed the Hambledon Club proper was formed not long afterwards. Land was interested in hunting and maintained a pack of hounds that earned him recognition as "one of the most celebrated fox-hunters in Great-Britain".

Land is mentioned in the Hambledon Club Song written by Reverend Reynell Cotton in 1767. Apparently, Cotton was not too concerned about Land having left the club:

Then why should we fear either Sackville or Mann,
Or repine at the loss of both Bayton and Land?

== Growth ==
From the mid-1760s, Hambledon's stature grew till by the late 1770s it was the foremost cricket club in England. In spite of its relative remoteness, it had developed into a private club of noblemen and country gentry, for whom one of cricket's attractions was the opportunity it offered for betting. Although some of these occasionally played in matches, professional players were mainly employed. The club produced several famous players including John Small, Thomas Brett, Richard Nyren, David Harris, Tom Taylor, Billy Beldham and Tom Walker. It was also the inspiration for the first significant cricket book: The Cricketers of My Time by John Nyren, the son of Richard Nyren.

== County teams ==
The Hambledon Club was essentially social and, as it was multi-functional, not really a cricket club as such. Rather it is seen as an organiser of matches. Arguments have taken place among historians about whether its teams should be termed Hampshire or Hambledon. A study of the sources indicates that the nomenclature changed frequently and both terms were applicable.

On 24 June 1772, Hampshire won by 53 runs against England at Broadhalfpenny Down.

The subject is complicated by a reference to the Kent versus Hampshire & Sussex match at Guildford Bason on 26 and 28 August 1772. According to the source, "Hampshire & Sussex" was synonymous with "Hambledon Club". Sussex cricket was not very prominent during the Hambledon period and this could have been because Hambledon operated a team effectively representing two counties. Certainly there were Sussex connections at Hambledon such as John Bayton, Richard Nyren, William Barber and Noah Mann.

== Broadhalfpenny Down to Windmill Down ==
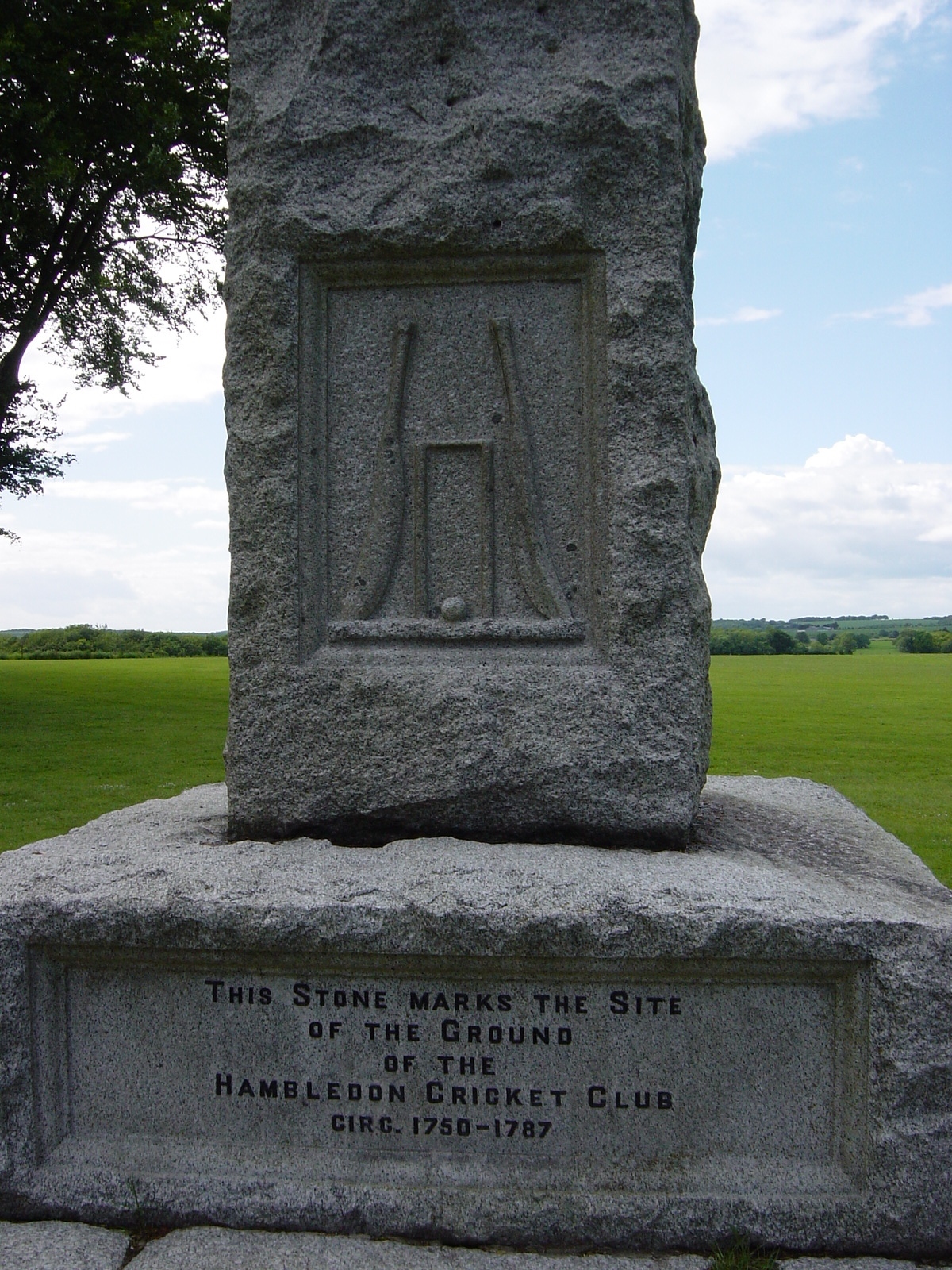
Monument to Hambledon Cricket Club at Broadhalfpenny Down

In 1782 the club moved from its original ground at Broadhalfpenny Down to Windmill Down, about half a mile away towards the village of Hambledon. The Bat and Ball Inn had been requisitioned as a munitions dump by the military, and Windmill Down provided as an alternative. However, after a couple of seasons playing on the steep sloping and highly exposed new ground the club agitated for a move to a more suitable location and Ridge Meadow was purchased as a permanent replacement. Ridge Meadow is still the home of Hambledon C.C. today.

== Hambledon to Marylebone ==
Hambledon's great days ended in the 1780s with a shift in focus from the rural counties of Kent, Sussex and Hampshire to metropolitan London where Lord's was established as the home of the new Marylebone Cricket Club in 1787. However, for the decade up to 1793, Hambledon remained a meeting place for like-minded Royal Navy Officers such as Captains Erasmus Gower, Robert Calder, Charles Powell Hamilton, Mark Robinson, Sir Hyde Parker and Robert Linzee. In May 1791 Lord Hugh Seymour became president of the club but soon afterwards these officers all returned to sea.

Membership declined during the 1790s. On 29 August 1796, fifteen people attended a meeting and amongst them, according to the official minutes, was "Mr Thos Pain, Authour of the rights of Man". This was certainly a joke, since Thomas Paine was then in France, having left England in 1792 shortly before being convicted of seditious libel in absentia. The last meeting was held on 21 September 1796 where the minutes read only that "No Gentlemen were present".

== Toast ==
The club had a famous round of six toasts:

6. The Queen's mother
5. The King (regardless of who was on the throne)
4. The Hambledon Club
3. Cricket
2. The Immortal Memory of Madge
1. The President.

"Madge" is a "what", not a "who", a common crude contemporary reference to the vagina.

== New beginning ==
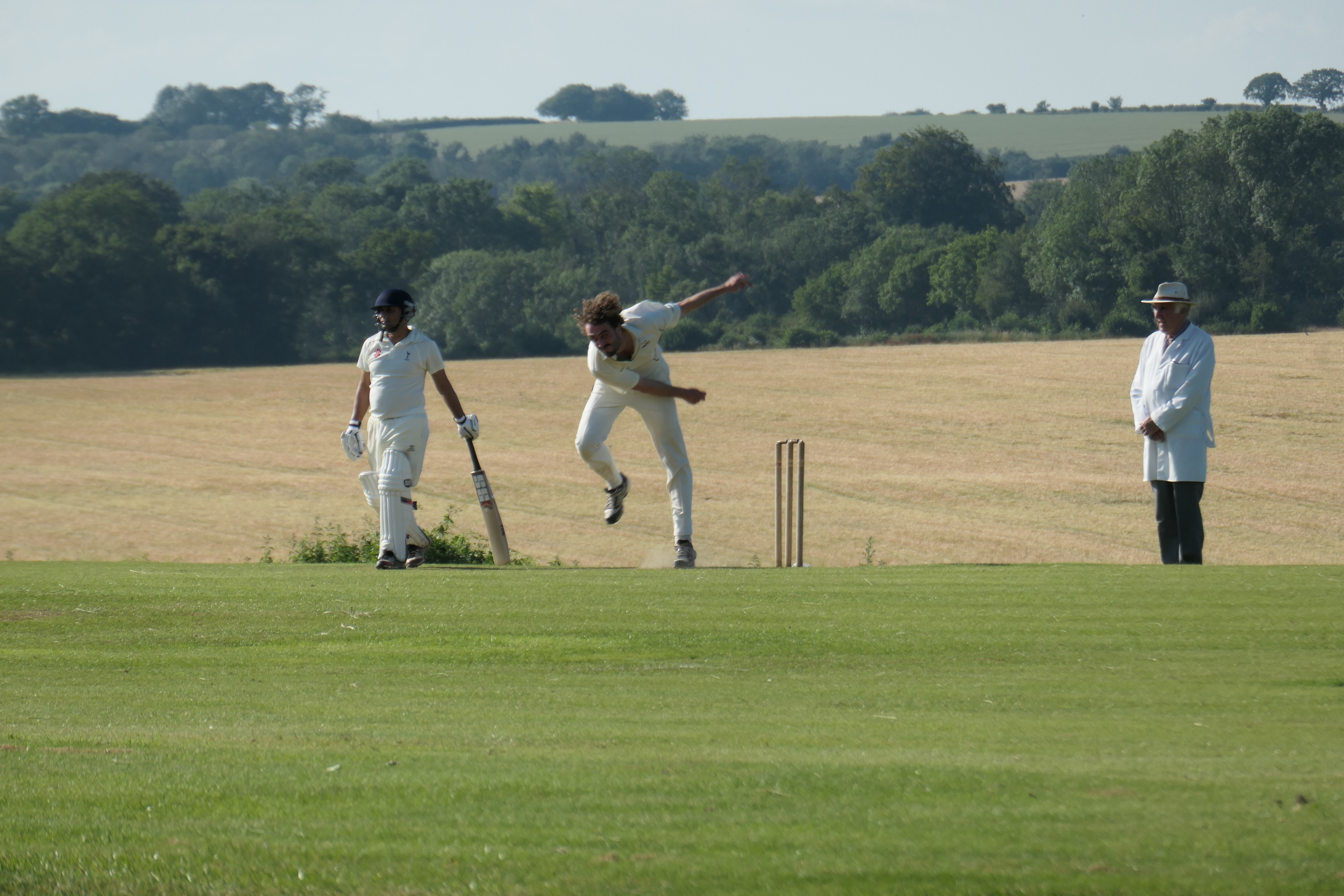
Bowling on Broadhalfpenny Down today

A description of the revival and, indeed, the whole history of the Hambledon Club can be read in The Glory Days of Cricket by Ashley Mote.

The original ground is at Broadhalfpenny Down, opposite the Bat and Ball Inn, in Hyden Farm Lane, near Clanfield, where now the Broadhalfpenny Brigands Cricket Club play.

The current Hambledon Cricket Club ground is nearer Hambledon village at Ridge Meadow, just off the road to Broadhalfpenny Down, about half a mile from the village. On Saturday 8 September 2007 the clubhouse was burnt to the ground.

== Bibliography ==
- Mote, Ashley (1997). The Glory Days of Cricket. Robson.
- Nyren, John (1998). Ashley Mote (ed.). The Cricketers of my Time. Robson.
