= Broadhalfpenny Down =

Historic cricket ground in Hambledon, Hampshire

Coordinates: 50.946°N 1.038°W

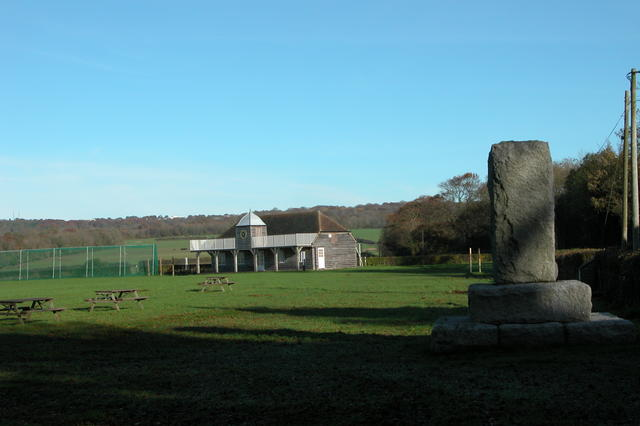
View of Broadhalfpenny Down

Broadhalfpenny Down (pronounced /ˌbrɔ:dˈheɪpniː/; brawd-HAYP-nee) is a historic cricket ground in Hambledon, Hampshire. It was the home of the Hambledon Club, one of the most important cricket clubs of the 18th century, and is widely regarded as the “Cradle of Cricket” for its central role in the sport’s early development.

The ground rose to prominence in the mid-18th century, particularly from the 1750s to the 1780s, when Hambledon was a leading centre of the game. Many of the period’s most significant matches were played there, including games later classified as first-class, and the club’s players and patrons were influential in shaping the Laws of Cricket. The venue is associated with early figures such as John Nyren and Richard Nyren, and with the broader codification and popularisation of cricket during this formative period.

Broadhalfpenny Down declined in importance after the Hambledon Club moved to Windmill Down in 1781, and the ground subsequently fell out of regular use. It was restored in the 20th century, notably through the efforts of the Hambledon Club’s successors, and has since been preserved as a site of historical significance.

Today, the ground is used for occasional matches and commemorative events, and remains an important landmark in the history of cricket, and is on the Monarch's Way long-distance footpath.

== Hambledon era ==
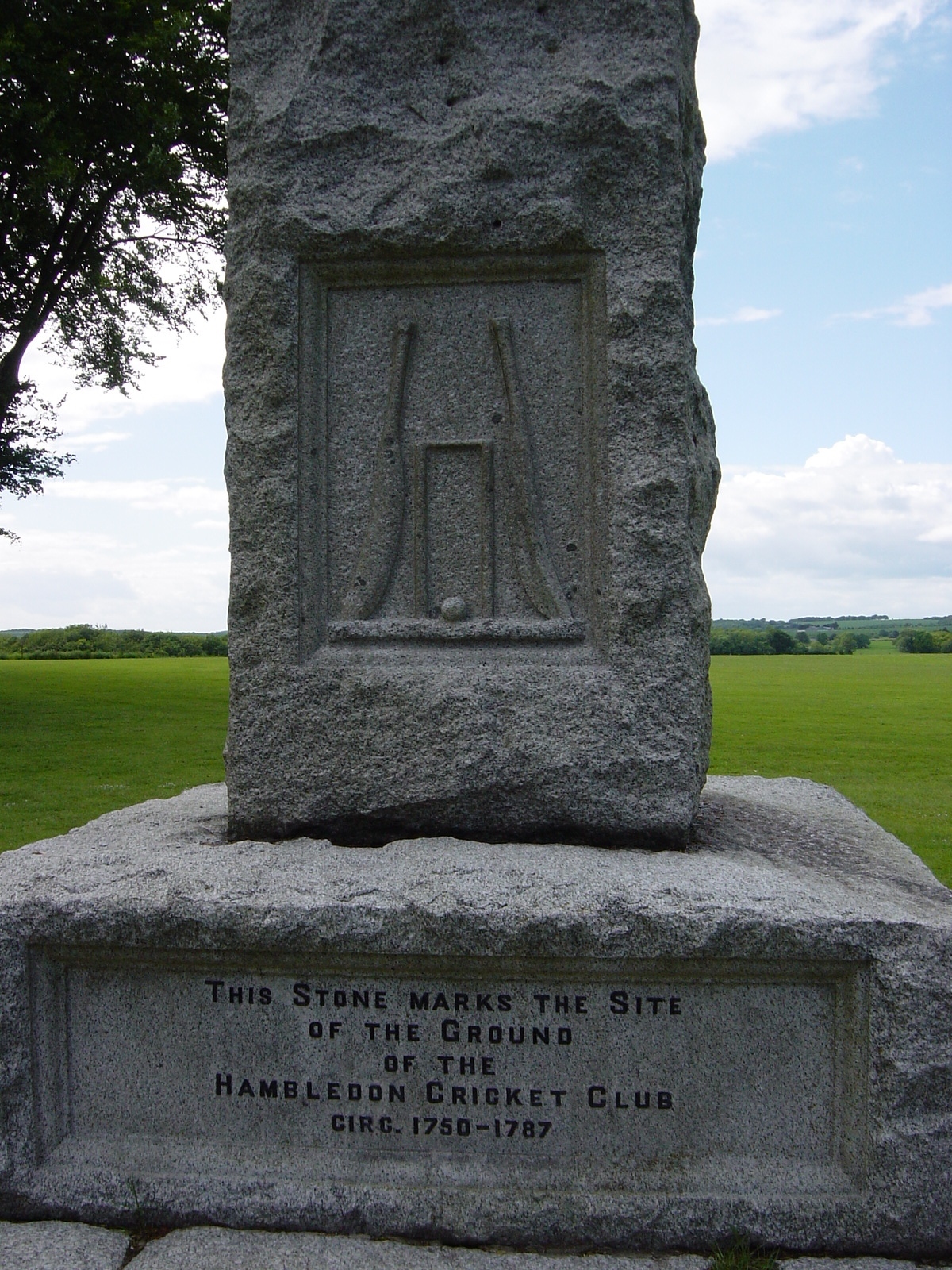
The monument to the Glory of Cricket and the Hambledon Club at Broadhalfpenny Down, erected in 1908 and unveiled by the Army cricketer Edward Sprot

The ground was the home venue for matches organised by the Hambledon Club from 1753 to 1781, which generally involved Hampshire's county team. It was used for other sports, including horse racing and hare coursing. Next to the ground is the Bat & Ball Inn, known as the "cradle of cricket", whose landlord for ten years from 1762 to 1772 was Hambledon captain Richard Nyren. Nyren was succeeded by his Hambledon colleague William Barber, who ran the pub from 1772 to 1784.

The name "Broadhalfpenny" is pronounced "broad ha'penny", following the common pronunciation of the halfpenny coin. Charters from the Crown for markets or fairs were issued with Letters Patent stamped with "Broad-Halfpenny". Hambledon in the 18th century was a large parish of over 9,000 acres, containing small hamlets and detached farms in addition to the main village. Much of the agricultural land had been enclosed in small farms, but there remained extensive commons, including Broadhalfpenny, on which grazing rights existed.

As a venue for historically important matches, the earliest known use of Broadhalfpenny Down was in August 1753 for a match between Hambledon and Surrey. Three years later, Hambledon were able to challenge Dartford, then one of the strongest teams in England, in a series of three matches. On Wednesday, 18 August, one of these matches was played at Broadhalfpenny Down. The source for this is an advertisement placed in the Reading Mercury newspaper by the Reverend Richard Keats of Chalton for information about his dog, a spaniel called Rover, whom he lost at the match. Reverend Keats was the father of Admiral Sir Richard Goodwin Keats who is renowned for his actions at the Battle of Algeciras Bay in July 1801. Chalton is three and a half miles east of Broadhalfpenny Down, beyond Clanfield.

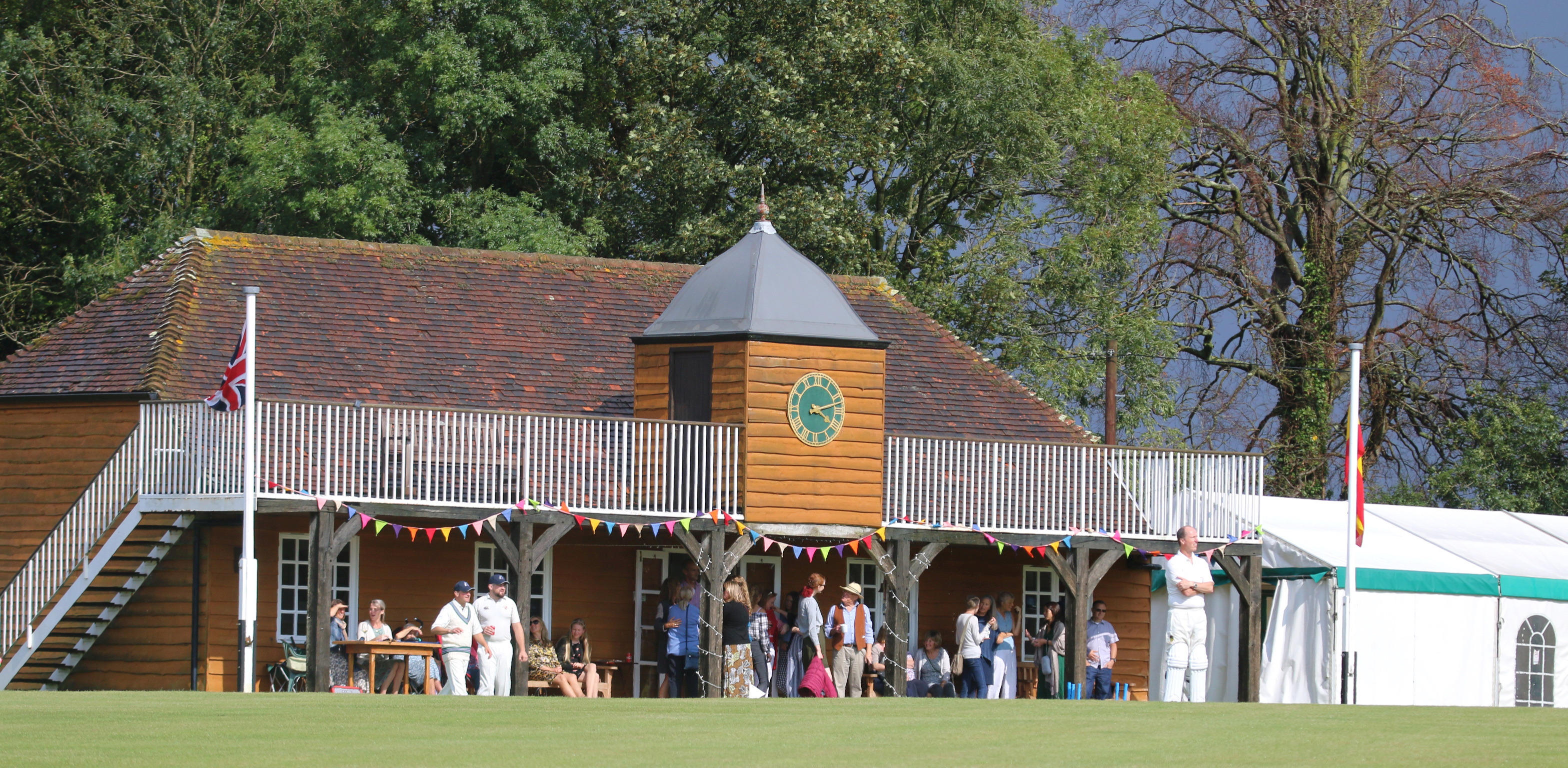
Broadhalfpenny Down Pavilion in the summer of 2019

Match reports were scarce in the 1750s but were becoming more common in the 1760s, and it is known that Hampshire defeated Kent at Broadhalfpenny in 1768, their outstanding batsman John Small scoring more than 140 runs in the match. Scores were higher then than in earlier times, and matches tended to go into a second day. In 1770, a Sussex lawyer called John Baker left an account in his diary of a match between Hambledon and the Surrey club Coulsdon, which lasted two days. Baker came from Chichester, a journey of twenty miles taking four hours on horseback. He wrote how he went to Petersfield for overnight accommodation. Baker wrote about the very large crowds that gathered at these matches and the good business done by vendors on site.

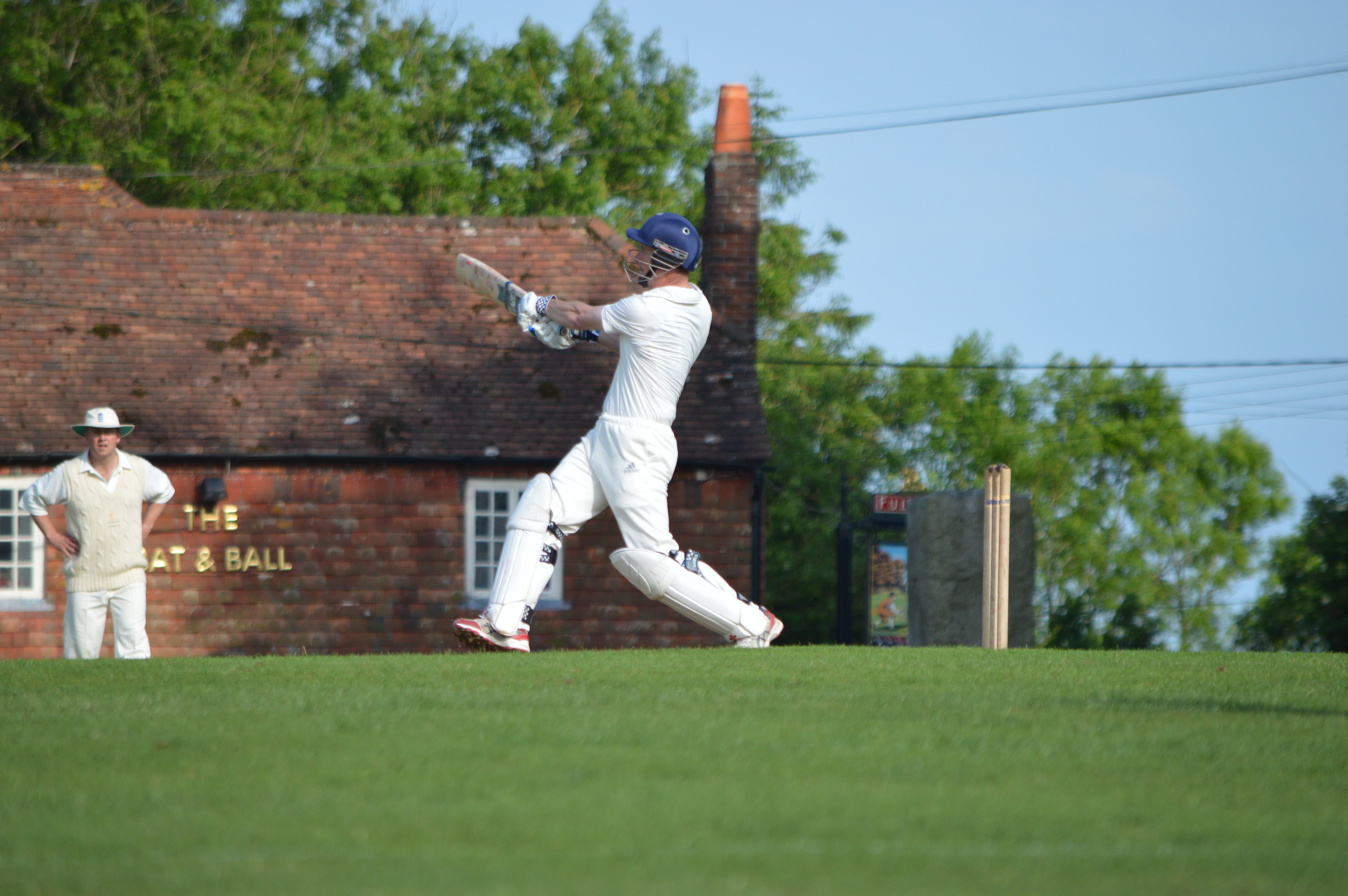
A batsman hits out in front of the Bat & Ball public house.

The 1772 season is notable in English cricket history because it is from then that surviving scorecards are common, and three exist for 1772 matches organised by the Hambledon Club, which commence a continuous statistical record. Those three matches were all between Hampshire and England, the first played at Broadhalfpenny on 24 and 25 June.

On 13 July 1775, Small scored 136 not out and Nyren 98 for Hampshire against Surrey at Broadhalfpenny. Small's innings is the earliest century definitely recorded in an important match. During the match, Charles Powlett, a Hambledon Club steward and member of the Laws of Cricket committee, reportedly bet on a Surrey victory despite being associated with Hampshire. Nyren later joined Small at the wicket, and their partnership enabled Hampshire to recover and win. According to Underdown, Powlett and his associate later complained about their losses, to which Nyren reportedly replied that they should not bet against his side.

Broadhalfpenny Down continued in regular use by Hambledon/Hampshire until 1781. At the end of that season, the Hambledon Club moved to Windmill Down, which is closer to the village. According to John Nyren, Windmill was "one of the finest places for playing on I ever saw". A key difference was that Windmill was under the club's control as they rented it from a farmer at ten guineas a year, whereas Broadhalfpenny was common land in use as sheep pasture, for fairs and other gatherings.

It could be said that Broadhalfpenny belonged to the community and Windmill to the club, whose members may not have been happy about the "raucous, boisterous crowds" that gathered on the Down. The move was made at the behest of the Duke of Dorset, the leading club member, and David Underdown saw it as the first step in a process that removed professional cricket from a truly rural setting and ultimately concentrated it in an urban environment. According to Underdown, it was Dorset's successors, George Finch, 9th Earl of Winchilsea, and Colonel Charles Lennox, who were the key players in the establishment of the White Conduit Club in Islington and, subsequently, the Marylebone Cricket Club at Lord's.

== Later years ==
During the 19th century, the ground fell into disuse and was converted to agricultural use. It was briefly revived in 1908 for a match between Hambledon and an England XI, generally regarded as a first-class fixture, which included players such as C. B. Fry and Phil Mead. Among the participants was Hampshire player Edward Whalley-Tooker, a descendant of a member of the original Hambledon Club.

The ground subsequently reverted to farmland, but Whalley-Tooker later led efforts to secure its permanent restoration for cricket. In 1924, Winchester College purchased the freehold of the ground with the aim of restoring it to cricket use. The site was re-established as a cricket venue in 1925, when a match between the college and Hambledon marked its return to use.

In 1939, a match was held at the ground between a team organised by its lessee, the engineering firm Wadhams, and Westgate Brewery, marking Portsmouth F.C.'s victory in the 1939 FA Cup final. The match included former England captain Pelham Warner, who reportedly referred to the ground as "holy ground".

In 2000, the historian David Underdown visited the ground while researching his book Start of Play. He described "a clunky monument and a green field with a cricket pavilion, sightscreens, and a square that bore the scars of recent matches", situated across the road from the Bat and Ball Inn. A notice by the pavilion identified it as the home ground of the "Broadhalfpenny Buccaneers". This appears to refer to the Broadhalfpenny Brigands, who have played at the ground since 1959.

In 2022, Broadhalfpenny Down marked the 250th anniversary of the first recognised first-class cricket match, played there in 1772. As part of the commemorations, a Hampshire XI played an All England XI at the ground on 24 June 2022, with Hampshire winning by three runs.

Today, Hambledon Cricket Club uses Broadhalfpenny Down for some third XI, fourth XI and junior fixtures. The ground is also used for visually impaired cricket.

== New Year's Day matches ==
Team sheet for New Year's Day match 2022

Broadhalfpenny Down hosted a New Year's Day match in 2022 as part of commemorations marking 250 years since the first recognised first-class match was played there in 1772. The Broadhalfpenny Brigands played the Hampshire Huskies, who won by 17 runs. It was the ground's first New Year's Day match since the turn of the millennium and only its third recorded New Year's Day fixture, following a 1929 charity match between the Hampshire Eskimos and the Invalids Cricket Club.

== Broadhalfpenny Down Preservation Trust ==
The Broadhalfpenny Down Preservation Trust was incorporated on 10 November 2010 and registered as a charity in England and Wales in 2012. Its stated activities are to secure the long-term future of the ground, promote community participation in cricket, and support public education about the history of the ground and the game.

== Bibliography ==
- Ashley-Cooper, F. S. (1924). Hambledon Cricket Chronicle 1772–1796. Jenkins.
- Maun, Ian (2011). From Commons to Lord's, Volume Two: 1751 to 1770. Martin Wilson. ISBN 978-0-9569066-0-1.
- Underdown, David (2000). Start of Play. Allen Lane. ISBN 0-713-99330-8.
