= Hampshire county cricket team (pre-1864) =

Historical English cricket team

Hampshire
Team information
- Established: before 1729
- Last match: 1861
- Home venue: Broadhalfpenny Down; Windmill Down; Itchin Stoke Down

History
- Notable players: John Small; Thomas Brett; Richard Nyren; Tom Sueter; Tom Taylor; David Harris

Until 1863, the Hampshire county cricket team, always known as Hampshire, was organised by individual patrons and other groups, particularly the Hambledon Club in the second half of the 18th century. It played historically important matches from the early 18th century until the formation of Hampshire County Cricket Club on 12 August 1863. (Note: Any match listed in the ACS' Important Match Guide (1981) is historically important, and therefore of the highest standard, whether or not a scorecard might exist. The same applies to numerous matches discovered by researchers since 1981. For further information, see First-class cricket.)

== 17th century ==
As elsewhere in south east England, cricket became established in the county of Hampshire during the 17th century, and the earliest village cricket matches took place before the English Civil War. It is believed that the earliest county teams were formed in the aftermath of the Restoration in 1660.

A Latin poem by Robert Matthew in 1647 contains a probable reference to cricket being played by pupils of Winchester College on nearby St Catherine's Hill. If authentic, this is the earliest known mention of cricket in Hampshire. But, with the sport having originated in Saxon or Norman times on the Weald, it must have reached Hampshire long before 1647.

In 1680, lines written in an old Bible invite "All you that do delight in Cricket, come to Marden, pitch your wickets". Marden is in West Sussex, north of Chichester, and close to Hambledon, which is just across the county boundary in Hampshire.

== 18th century ==
Hampshire was used in a team name for the first time in August 1729, when a combined Hampshire, Surrey, and Sussex team played against Kent.

The earliest known cricket match to have been played in Hampshire took place on Tuesday, 22 May 1733. It was at Stubbington, near Portsmouth, between Married v Single. The Married team won. Details were found by Martin Wilson in the American Weekly Mercury, a Philadelphia newspaper dated 20 to 27 September 1733. Wilson subsequently found an earlier version of the report in an English newspaper, the 18 June 1733 edition of Parker's Penny Post.

== Hambledon Club ==
The origin of the Hambledon Club is lost, and there is no definite knowledge of Hambledon cricket before 1756 when its team had gained sufficient repute to be capable of attempting three matches against Dartford, which had been a famous club since the 1720s if not earlier. It is not known when the Hambledon Club was founded and it seems likely that some kind of parish organisation was operating in 1756, although there may well have been a patron involved.

The Sussex v Hampshire match in June 1766 is the earliest reference to Hampshire as an individual county team. Some historians believe it was at about this time that the club, as distinct from a parish organisation, was founded.

The Hambledon Club was in many respects a Hampshire county club for it organised Hampshire matches, although it was a multi-functional club and not dedicated to cricket alone. Its membership attracted large numbers of sporting gentry, and it dominated the sport, both on and off the field, for about thirty years until the formation of Marylebone Cricket Club (MCC) in 1787. Hambledon produced Hampshire players including batsman John Small and the two fast bowlers Thomas Brett and David Harris.

== 19th century ==
Following the demise of the Hambledon Club towards the end of the 18th century, Hampshire continued to be recognised as a major county team into the 19th century. After the 1828 season, Hampshire had long spells without any matches until the county club was founded in 1864. The county played some fixtures during 1842 to 1845, and one match versus Marylebone Cricket Club (MCC) in 1861, but was otherwise outside cricket's mainstream through 1829 to 1863. Hampshire County Cricket Club was founded on 12 August 1863 and played its first match against Sussex at the Antelope Ground, Southampton on 7 and 8 July 1864.

== Venues ==
Hampshire played their home matches prior to the formation of Hampshire County Cricket Club at the following grounds:

Official name (known as)	City or town	County side/use span	Ends/notes	Ref
Bramshill Park	Bramshill	Hampshire (1823–1826)		tbc
Broadhalfpenny Down	Hambledon	Hambledon and Hampshire (1756–1781); Hambledon XI (1908)		tbc
Cheden Holt†	Hambledon	Hampshire (1776)		tbc
Itchin Stoke Down†	Alresford	Hampshire (1778–1806)		tbc
Windmill Down†	Hambledon	Hampshire (1782–1792)		tbc

== Bibliography ==
- ACS (1981). A Guide to Important Cricket Matches Played in the British Isles 1709–1863. Nottingham: ACS. OCLC 85045528.
- ACS (1982). A Guide to First-class Cricket Matches Played in the British Isles. Nottingham: ACS. OCLC 10586869.
- Altham, H. S.; Swanton, E. W. (1962). A History of Cricket, Volume 1 (to 1914) (5th ed.). London: George Allen & Unwin. OCLC 894274808.
- Birley, Derek (1999). A Social History of English Cricket. London: Aurum Press. ISBN 978-18-54107-10-7 – via Internet Archive.
- Bowen, Rowland (1970). Cricket: A History of its Growth and Development. London: Eyre & Spottiswoode. ISBN 978-04-13278-60-9.
- Buckley, G. B. (1935). Fresh Light on 18th Century Cricket. Birmingham: Cotterell & Co. OCLC 23450280.
- Haygarth, Arthur (1997) [1862]. Scores & Biographies, Volume 2 (1827–1840). Kennington: Frederick Lillywhite. ISBN 978-19-00592-23-9.
- Major, John (2007). More Than A Game. London: HarperCollins. ISBN 978-00-07183-64-7 – via Internet Archive.
- Maun, Ian (2009). From Commons to Lord's, Volume One: 1700 to 1750. Cambridge: Roger Heavens. ISBN 978-19-00592-52-9.
- Maun, Ian (2011). From Commons to Lord's, Volume Two: 1751 to 1770. Leicester: Martin Wilson. ISBN 978-09-56906-60-1.
- McCann, Tim (2004). Sussex Cricket in the Eighteenth Century (PDF). Vol. 88. Lewes: West Sussex Record Office. ISBN 978-08-54450-55-8.
- Underdown, David (2000). Start of Play. Westminster: Allen Lane. ISBN 978-07-13993-30-1 – via Internet Archive.
- Waghorn, H. T. (1899). Cricket Scores, Notes, &c. From 1730–1773. Edinburgh: Blackwood. OCLC 1086375331.
- Waghorn, H. T. (2005) [1906]. The Dawn of Cricket. London: J. W. McKenzie. ISBN 978-09-47821-17-3.
- Webber, Roy (1960). The Phoenix History of Cricket. Charing Cross, London: Phoenix House Ltd. OCLC 5391059.
- Wilson, Martin (2005). An Index to Waghorn. London: Bodyline Books (limited edition, by subscription only).
