= List of first-class cricket records =

This list of first-class cricket records itemises some record team and individual performances in first-class cricket. The list is necessarily selective, since it is in cricket's nature to generate copious records and statistics. Both instance records (such as highest team and individual scores, lowest team scores and record margins of victory) and season and career records (such as most runs or wickets in a season, and most runs or wickets in a career) are included.

Officially, there was no "first-class cricket" in Great Britain before 1895 or in the rest of the world before 1947 (see First-class cricket for details of the official rulings). The performances noted in this article include several which occurred in earlier years but it is understood that all were achieved in matches that are retrospectively recognised by most historians or statisticians as first-class (i.e., unofficially so). Some matches have not been universally accepted as first-class for statistical purposes and there are thus variations in published cricket statistics, mainly because of the different proposals that have been made for the starting date of the statistical records, ranging from the 17th century to 1895.

Records shown here are quoted by either CricketArchive or Wisden Cricketers' Almanack, unless otherwise stated.

== Notation ==
Team notation

- 300–3 indicates that a team scored 300 runs for three wickets and the innings was closed, either due to a successful run chase or if no playing time remained.
- 300-3d indicates that a team scored 300 runs for three wickets, and declared its innings closed.
- 300 indicates that a team scored 300 runs and was all out.

Batting Notation

- 100 indicates that a batter scored 100 runs and was out.
- 100* indicates that a batter scored 100 runs and was not out.
- 100* against a partnership means that the two batters added 100 runs to the team's total, and neither of them was out.

Bowling Notation

- 5–100 indicates that a bowler captured 5 wickets while conceding 100 runs.

== Team records ==
=== Team scoring records ===
==== Greatest margins of victory by an innings ====
Qualification: Innings and 550 runs.

Margin	Teams	Venue	Season
Innings and 851 runs	Pakistan Railways beat Dera Ismail Khan	Lahore	1964–65
Innings and 666 runs	Victoria beat Tasmania	Melbourne	1922–23
Innings and 656 runs	Victoria beat New South Wales	Melbourne	1926–27
Innings and 605 runs	New South Wales beat South Australia	Sydney	1900–01
Innings and 579 runs	England beat Australia	The Oval	1938
Innings and 575 runs	Sind beat Baluchistan	Karachi	1973–74
Innings and 551 runs	Goa beat Arunachal Pradesh	Porvorim	2024–25
Source: Wisden 2006. Last updated: 14 November 2024.

==== Greatest margins of victory by runs ====
Qualification: 575 runs.

Margin	Teams	Venue	Season
725 runs	Mumbai beat Uttarakhand	Bangaluru	2021–22
685 runs	New South Wales beat Queensland	Sydney	1929–30
675 runs	England beat Australia	Brisbane	1928–29
645 runs	South Zone beat North Zone	Salem	2022–23
638 runs	New South Wales beat South Australia	Adelaide	1920–21
609 runs	Muslim Commercial Bank beat Water and Power Development Authority	Lahore	1977–78
585 runs	Sargodha beat Lahore Municipal Corporation	Faisalabad	1978–79
Source: Cricinfo. Last updated: 21 September 2022.

==== Victory without losing a wicket ====
Teams	Venue	Season
Lancashire beat Leicestershire	Manchester	1956
Karachi A beat Sind A	Karachi	1957–58
Railways beat Jammu and Kashmir	Srinagar	1960–61
Karnataka beat Kerala	Chikmagalur	1977–78
Source: Wisden 2006. Last updated: 19 May 2006.

==== Ties ====
There have been 33 ties in first-class cricket since 1948. Before then, a tie was sometimes declared where the scores were level when scheduled play ended, but the side batting last still had wickets in hand. Matches where this happens are considered a draw today, and a tie is now recognised only where the scores are level and the side batting fourth is dismissed.

==== Highest totals ====
Qualification: 900.

Runs	Teams	Venue	Season
1,107	Victoria (v New South Wales)	Melbourne	1926–27
1,059	Victoria (v Tasmania)	Melbourne	1922–23
952-6d	Sri Lanka (v India)	Colombo	1997
951-7d	Sind (v Baluchistan)	Karachi	1973–74
944-6d	Hyderabad (v Andhra)	Secunderabad	1993–94
918	New South Wales (v South Australia)	Sydney	1900–01
912-8d	Holkar (v Mysore)	Indore	1945–46
912-6d^{†}	Tamil Nadu (v Goa)	Panaji	1988–89
910-6d	Railways (v Dera Ismail Khan)	Lahore	1964–65
903-7d	England (v Australia)	The Oval	1938
900-6d	Queensland (v Victoria)	Brisbane	2005–06
^{†} Tamil Nadu's total of 912-6d included 52 penalty runs.
The highest aggregate in a first-class match (both sides) was 2376, Maharashtra v Bombay at Poona, 1948–49.
Totals of 800 and above have been compiled on 41 occasions, most recently by Surrey (scoring 820 for nine declared) against Durham at The Oval, in a 2025 County Championship match.
Source: Wisden 2006 and ACS. Last updated: 1 July 2025.

==== Lowest totals ====
Qualification: 15.

Runs	Teams	Venue	Season
6	The Bs (v England)	Lord's	1810
12	Oxford University (v MCC)	Oxford	1877
12	Northamptonshire (v Gloucestershire)	Gloucester	1907
13	Auckland (v Canterbury)	Auckland	1877–78
13	Nottinghamshire (v Yorkshire)	Nottingham	1901
14	Surrey (v Essex)	Chelmsford	1983
15	MCC (v Surrey)	Lord's	1839
15	Victoria (v MCC)	Melbourne	1903–04
15	Northamptonshire (v Yorkshire)	Northampton	1908
15	Hampshire (v Warwickshire)	Birmingham	1922
The lowest combined total for a side's two innings is 34 (16 and 18) by Border against Natal at East London in 1959–60.
The lowest aggregate for a completed first-class match (both sides) is 85, Quetta v Rawalpindi at Islamabad, 2008–09. The lowest aggregate for a completed first-class match where the winning side bowled their opponents out twice is 105, MCC v Australians at Lord's, 1878.
The lowest successfully defended fourth-innings target in a first-class match is 40 by Pakistan TV, who beat Sui Northern Gas Pipelines Limited at Karachi in 2025–26, bowling them out for 37 to win by 2 runs.
Sides have been bowled out for 20 or fewer on 36 occasions (including five before 1864 that are not universally considered first-class), the most recent being 16 by Border against KwaZulu-Natal at Paarl in 2020–21 (Border had two men absent injured).
Source: CricketArchive. Last updated 23 March 2021.

==== Highest totals in the fourth innings ====
Qualification: 510.

Runs	Teams	Result	Venue	Season
654–5	England (v South Africa)	Drawn	Durban	1938–39
604	Maharashtra (v Bombay)	Bombay won by 354 runs	Pune	1948–49
592	Glamorgan (v Gloucestershire)	Tied	Cheltenham	2024
576–8	Trinidad (v Barbados)	Drawn	Port-of-Spain	1945–46
572	New South Wales (v South Australia)	South Australia won by 20 runs	Sydney	1907–08
541–7	West Zone (v South Zone)	West Zone won by three wickets	Hyderabad	2009–10
529–9	Western Australia Combined XI (v South Africans)	Drawn	Perth	1963–64
518	Victoria (v Queensland)	Queensland won by 234 runs	Brisbane	1926–27
513–9	Central Province (v Southern Province)	Central Province won by one wicket	Kandy	2003–04
Source: Wisden 2006. Last updated: 3 July 2024.

== Individual records ==
=== Individual records (batting) ===
==== Highest individual score ====
The highest individual score in first-class cricket is 501* scored by Brian Lara for Warwickshire in 1994. There have been eleven other scores of 400 or more, including another by Lara and two by Bill Ponsford.

Scorecards began to be kept regularly from the 1772 season which is now seen as the commencement of the statistical first-class record, though historical first-class cricket began a century earlier. There is no certainty of a complete statistical record of any season until well into the 19th century, which is why Roy Webber and others have been reluctant to begin their first-class cricket statistics before the 1864 season, notwithstanding the official commencement of first-class cricket in 1895.

The earliest century definitely recorded in a match generally regarded as first-class is the 136 scored by John Small in the 1775 season (see below). There can be little doubt that centuries had been scored before this but the records are either lost or the known details are incomplete. Some of the main instances of high scoring prior to 1772 are as follows:

- 1744 – John Harris scored 47 for Slindon v. London at the Artillery Ground in the match which has left the oldest known scorecard. This is the earliest match from which individual scores are known. The oldest known team scores date from 1731.
- 1745 – Richard Newland scored 88 for England v. Kent at the Artillery Ground, almost certainly in the second innings of the match, but there is a slight possibility that it was his match total. This is the highest known score recorded prior to the introduction c.1760 of the pitched delivery and the straight bat.
- 1767 – two Hampshire batters (believed to have been Tom Sueter and either George Leer or Edward "Curry" Aburrow) recorded a first-wicket partnership of 192 against Surrey, but there is no record of their individual scores, although at least one of the batters probably made a personal century. It is the earliest known century partnership.
- 1768 – John Small scored "above seven score notches" for Hampshire v Kent, but it is not known if this was his match total or his performance in the second innings. If it was his match total, he could still have made a century in either innings.
- 1769 – John Minshull (listed as "J. Minchin" on the scorecard) scored the earliest century in all classes of cricket of which there is a definite record: he made 107 for the Duke of Dorset's XI v Wrotham at Sevenoaks Vine (although the location is not certain), but the match is generally considered a minor one.

The following individual scores in first-class matches from 1772 are progressively the highest definitely recorded on contemporary scorecards:

- 78 – John Small for Hampshire v England at Broadhalfpenny Down in 1772. This was the highest score recorded in the earliest match now designated first-class by some statisticians and remained the highest known score through the 1772 season.
- 88 – William Yalden for Surrey v Hampshire at Broadhalfpenny Down in 1773.
- 95 – Joseph Miller for Kent v Hampshire at Sevenoaks Vine in 1774.
- 136 – John Small for Hampshire v Surrey at Broadhalfpenny Down in 1775. This is the earliest known century in a first-class match. Small's colleague Richard Nyren scored 98 in the same innings so they both beat Miller's score.
- 167 – James Aylward for Hampshire v England at Sevenoaks Vine in 1777.
- 170 – Lord Frederick Beauclerk for Homerton v Montpelier at Aram's New Ground in 1806. This match is considered a minor one in the opinion of some statisticians but several other matches involving either team are rated first-class. Its inclusion in Scores and Biographies is significant and it is first-class on that basis.
- 278 – William Ward for Marylebone Cricket Club (MCC) v Norfolk at Lord's in 1820. Again, there is some doubt among certain statisticians about the status of Norfolk but the match's inclusion in Scores and Biographies is significant.

Ward's record survived for 56 years until W. G. Grace scored the first triple-century in first-class cricket in 1876. The table below shows the progressive world record from 1876.

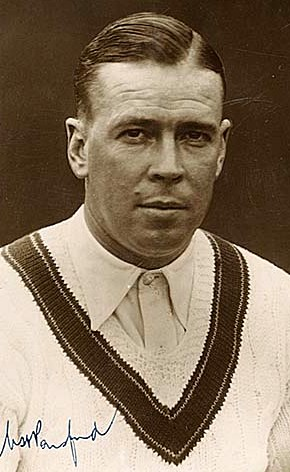
Bill Ponsford, who twice broke the record for highest individual score

Runs	Player	Match	Venue	Season
344	W. G. Grace (Gentlemen of MCC)	Kent v Gentlemen of MCC	Canterbury	1876
424	Archie MacLaren (Lancashire)	Somerset v Lancashire	Taunton	1895
429	Bill Ponsford (Victoria)	Victoria v Tasmania	Melbourne	1922–23
437	Bill Ponsford (Victoria)	Victoria v Queensland	Melbourne	1927–28
452*	Don Bradman (New South Wales)	New South Wales v Queensland	Sydney	1929–30
499	Hanif Mohammad (Karachi)	Karachi v Bahawalpur	Karachi	1958–59
501*	Brian Lara (Warwickshire)	Warwickshire v Durham	Birmingham	1994

==== Most runs in a career ====
Qualification: 40,000.

Runs	Player	Innings	Matches	Average	Career span
61,760	Jack Hobbs (Surrey and England)	1,325	834	50.70	from 1905 to 1934
58,959	Frank Woolley (Kent and England)	1,530	978	40.77	from 1906 to 1938
57,611	Patsy Hendren (Middlesex and England)	1,300	833	50.80	from 1907 to 1938
55,061	Phil Mead (Hampshire and England)	1,340	814	47.67	from 1905 to 1936
54,211	W. G. Grace (Gloucestershire, London County, and England)	1,478	870	39.45	from 1865 to 1908
50,670	Herbert Sutcliffe (Yorkshire and England)	1,098	754	52.02	from 1919 to 1945
50,551	Wally Hammond (Gloucestershire and England)	1,005	634	56.10	from 1920 to 1951
48,426	Geoffrey Boycott (Yorkshire, Northern Transvaal and England)	1,014	609	56.83	from 1962 to 1986
47,793	Tom Graveney (Gloucestershire, Worcestershire and England)	1,223	732	44.91	from 1948 to 1971–72
44,846	Graham Gooch (Essex, Western Province and England)	990	581	49.01	from 1973 to 1997 (plus one match in 2000)
43,551	Tom Hayward (Surrey and England)	1,138	712	41.79	from 1893 to 1914
43,423	Dennis Amiss (Warwickshire and England)	1,139	658	42.86	from 1960 to 1987
42,719	Colin Cowdrey (Kent and England)	1,130	692	42.89	from 1950 to 1976
41,284	Andy Sandham (Surrey and England)	1,000	643	44.82	from 1911 to 1937–38
41,112	Graeme Hick (Worcestershire, England, Zimbabwe, Queensland and Northern Districts)	871	526	52.23	from 1983–84 to 2008
40,140	Len Hutton (Yorkshire and England)	814	513	55.51	from 1934 to 1960
Source: Wisden 2006 and CricketArchive – 20,000 or more runs in a first-class career. Last updated: 17 October 2009. Current list @ ESPNcricinfo (min. 30,225 runs)

==== Highest career average ====
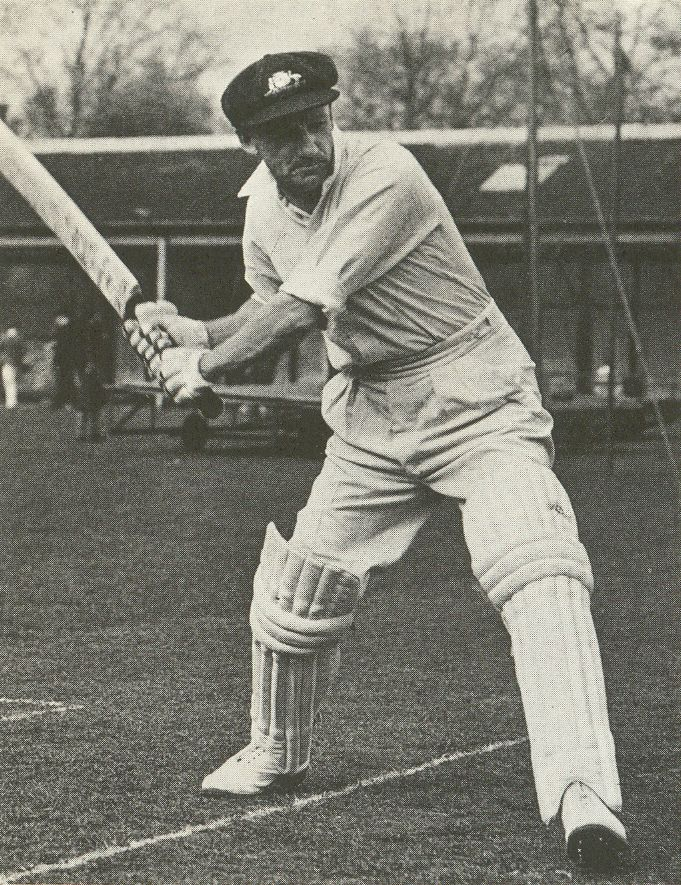
Don Bradman: his first-class average of 95.14 is, like his Test average of 99.94, much higher than any other batter's

Qualification: 20,000 runs, average 54.

Average	Player	Matches	Runs	Career span
95.14	Don Bradman (New South Wales, South Australia and Australia)	234	28,067	from 1927–28 to 1948–49
57.84	Sachin Tendulkar (Bombay/Mumbai, Yorkshire and India)	310	25,396	from 1988–89 to 2013–14
57.83	Darren Lehmann (South Australia, Victoria, Australia and Yorkshire)	284	25,795	from 1987–88 to 2007–08
56.83	Geoff Boycott (Yorkshire, Northern Transvaal and England)	609	48,426	from 1962 to 1986
56.37	Ranjitsinhji (Sussex and England)	307	24,692	from 1893 to 1912 (plus three matches in 1920)
56.22	Bob Simpson (New South Wales, Western Australia and Australia)	257	21,029	from 1952–53 to 1977–78
56.10	Wally Hammond (Gloucestershire and England)	634	50,551	from 1920 to 1947 (plus occasional matches to 1951)
55.90	Ricky Ponting (Tasmania and Australia)	289	24,150	from 1992–93 to 2013
55.51	Len Hutton (Yorkshire and England)	513	40,140	from 1934 to 1955 (plus occasional matches to 1960)
55.33	Rahul Dravid (Karnataka and India)	298	23,794	from 1990–91 to 2011–12
54.87	Gary Sobers (Barbados, West Indies, South Australia and Nottinghamshire)	383	28,314	from 1952–53 to 1974
54.74	Barry Richards (Natal, South Africa, Hampshire and South Australia)	339	28,358	from 1964–65 to 1982–83
54.67	Graeme Pollock (Eastern Province, Transvaal and South Africa)	262	20,940	from 1960–61 to 1986–87
In addition to Bradman, the following batters batted in 100 innings or more with an average of 64.00 or above: 71.64 – Vijay Merchant, 150 matches, 13,470 runs, from 1929–30 to 1950–51; 69.86 – George Headley, 103 matches, 9,921 runs, from 1927–28 to 1948–49 plus occasional matches to 1954; 67.46 – Ajay Sharma, 129 matches, 10,120 runs, from 1984–85 to 1999–2000; 65.18 – Bill Ponsford, 162 matches, 13,819 runs, from 1920–21 to 1934–35; 64.99 – Bill Woodfull, 174 matches, 13,388 runs, from 1921–22 to 1934–35
Source: Wisden 2006, CricketArchive – 20,000 or more runs in a first-class career and Cricinfo – Highest career batting average. Last updated: 4 May 2018.

The highest first-class batting career average of all is 207.00, by Norman Callaway, who aged 18 scored 207 in his only first-class innings on his début for New South Wales against Queensland in 1914–15. He died during the Second Battle of Bullecourt in 1917.

==== Most runs in a season ====
Runs	Player	Season
3,816 runs (50 innings, average 90.85)	Denis Compton (Middlesex & England)	1947
3,539 runs (52 innings, average 80.43)	Bill Edrich (Middlesex & England)	1947
3,518 runs (61 innings, average 66.37)	Tom Hayward (Surrey and England)	1906
3,429 runs (56 innings, average 68.58)	Len Hutton (Yorkshire and England)	1949
3,352 runs (59 innings, average 60.94)	Frank Woolley (Kent and England)	1928
These records may never be beaten, because fewer first-class matches are played nowadays
Source: Wisden 2006. Last updated: 19 May 2006.

==== Most runs in an over ====
Runs	Sequence	Batter	Bowler	Match	Venue	Season
37	6 4 4 6 4 4 4 4 1 (3 no-balls contributed two extras each, so the over cost 43)	Louis Kimber (Leicestershire)	Ollie Robinson (Sussex)	Sussex v Leicestershire	Hove	2024
36	6 6 6 6 6 6	Garfield Sobers (Nottinghamshire)	Malcolm Nash (Glamorgan)	Glamorgan v Nottinghamshire	Swansea	1968
36	6 6 6 6 6 6	Ravi Shastri (Bombay)	Tilak Raj (Baroda)	Bombay v Baroda	Bombay	1984–85
34	4 6 6 0 4 4 4 6 (2 no-balls)	Ted Alletson (Nottinghamshire)	Ernest Killick (Sussex)	Sussex v Nottinghamshire	Hove	1911
34	4 0 4 4 6 6 6 4 (8-ball over)	Richard Edwards (New Zealand Governor-General's XI)	Joey Carew (West Indians)	Governor-General's XI v West Indians	Auckland	1968–69
34	6 4 6 6 6 6	Frank Hayes (Lancashire)	Malcolm Nash (Glamorgan)	Glamorgan v Lancashire	Swansea	1977
34	6 4 4 4 4 6 6 0 (2 no-balls contributed 2 extras each, so the over cost 38)	Andrew Flintoff (Lancashire)	Alex Tudor (Surrey)	Lancashire v Surrey	Manchester	1998
34	6 6 6 6 4 6	Craig Spearman (Gloucestershire)	Stephen Moreton (Oxford University Centre of Cricketing Excellence)	Oxford UCCE v Gloucestershire	Oxford	2005
34	6 6 6 6 6 4	Ben Stokes (Durham)	Josh Baker (Worcestershire)	Worcestershire v Durham	Worcester	2022
Shoaib Bashir of Worcestershire conceded 38 in an over to Surrey in 2024; Dan Lawrence hit five sixes and a single, and there were seven extras: five wides and a no-ball. The rules for debiting wides and no-balls against a bowler's analysis changed in the 1980s, and the number of runs for a no-ball is not consistent over all cricket competitions, so this record is, in Wisden and other sources, framed as runs scored by the batter rather than runs conceded by the bowler.
The following instances are not usually included as records because the bowlers deliberately conceded runs in an attempt to manufacture an otherwise unlikely victory
75	0 4 4 4 6 6 4 6 1 4 1 0 6 6 6 6 6 0 0 4 0 1 (including 17 no-balls and only five legitimate deliveries; 2 no-balls not scored off contributed one each, so the over cost 77)	Lee Germon and R. M. Ford (Canterbury)	R. H. Vance (Wellington)	Canterbury v Wellington	Christchurch	1989–90
34	6 6 6 6 4 6	Matthew Maynard (Glamorgan)	Steve Marsh (Kent)	Glamorgan v Kent	Swansea	1992
34	6 6 4 6 6 6	Glen Chapple (Lancashire)	Tony Cottey (Glamorgan)	Lancashire v Glamorgan	Manchester	1993
34	6 4 6 6 6 6	Barry Touzel (Western Province B)	Frans Viljoen (Griqualand West)	Western Province B v Griqualand West	Kimberley	1993–94
Source: Wisden 2006, and Cricinfo. Last updated: 26 June 2024.

==== High proportion of team's runs ====
It is not unusual for a batter to dominate the scoring while he is at the wicket; it is more unusual for a batter to dominate his side's completed total if they are all out.

The lowest completed first-class innings to include a fifty is Indians' 66 against Yorkshire at Harrogate in 1932, to which Nazir Ali contributed 52 (78.79%) and his partners 9 (there were 5 extras).

The lowest completed first-class innings to include a century is Nottinghamshire's 143 against Hampshire at Bournemouth in 1981, to which Clive Rice contributed 105* (73.4%) and his partners 35 (there were 3 extras) and Gujranwala's 143 against Bahawalpur at Bahawalpur in 2001–02, to which Rizwan Malik contributed 100* (69.93%) and his partners 41 (there were 2 extras).

The lowest completed first-class innings to include a double-century is Namibia's 282 against Kenya at Sharjah in January 2008, to which Gerrie Snyman contributed 230 (81.56%) and his partners 43 (there were 9 extras).

The lowest completed first-class innings to include a triple century is the Rest's 387 against Hindus at Bombay in 1943–44, to which Vijay Hazare contributed 309 (79.84%) and his partners 59 (there were 19 extras).

The lowest completed first-class total to include a score of 350 is Otago's 500 against Canterbury at Christchurch in 1952–53, to which opener Bert Sutcliffe contributed 385 (77.0%) and his partners 86 (there were 29 extras).

The highest percentage of runs scored in any completed innings is 83.43% by Glenn Turner who scored 141* out of Worcestershire's 169 against Glamorgan at Swansea in 1977. The remaining batters scored 27 and there was one extra.

In the 2007 English cricket season, Mark Ramprakash scored a record 30.02% of Surrey's runs excluding extras. In 16 matches he scored 2,026 runs at an average of 101.30, while his teammates managed 4,721 between them at an average of 26.08.

Conversely, the highest completed first-class innings not to include an individual century is 671 for nine declared by Surrey against Kent at Beckenham in 2022. Seven batters passed 50, and the top score was Ollie Pope's 96.

==== Most boundaries in an innings ====
Qualification: 55 boundaries.

boundaries	Player	Match	Season
72 (10 sixes and 62 fours)	Brian Lara (501*)	Warwickshire v Durham at Birmingham	1994
68 (68 fours)	Percy Perrin (343*)	Essex v Derbyshire at Chesterfield	1904
65 (a six and 64 fours)	Archie MacLaren (424)	Lancashire v Somerset at Taunton	1895
64 (64 fours)	Hanif Mohammad (499)	Karachi v Bahawalpur at Karachi	1958–59
60 (26 sixes and 34 fours)	Tanmay Agarwal (366)	Hyderabad v Arunachal Pradesh at Hyderabad	2023–24
58 (2 sixes and 56 fours)	Sakibul Gani (341)	Bihar v Mizoram at Kolkata	2021–22
58 (2 sixes and 56 fours)	Tom Banton (371)	Somerset v Worcestershire at Taunton	2025
57 (5 sixes and 52 fours)	John Edrich (310*) (The most boundaries in a Test match innings)	England v New Zealand at Leeds	1965
57 (5 sixes and 52 fours)	Naved Latif (394)	Sargodha v Gujranwala at Gujranwala	2000–01
56 (2 sixes and 54 fours)	Kedar Jadhav (327)	Maharashtra v Uttar Pradesh at Gahunje	2012–13
55 (55 fours)	Charles Gregory (383)	New South Wales v Queensland at Brisbane	1906–07
55 (2 sixes and 53 fours)	Geoff Marsh (355*)	Western Australia v South Australia at Perth	1989–90
55 (3 sixes, 1 five and 51 fours)	Sanjay Manjrekar (377)	Bombay v Hyderabad at Bombay	1990–91
55 (3 sixes and 52 fours)	Darren Lehmann (339)	Yorkshire v Durham at Headingley	2006
55 (1 six and 54 fours)	Daryl Mitchell (298)	Worcestershire v Somerset at Taunton	2009
55 (1 six and 54 fours)	Stephen Cook (390)	Lions v Warriors at East London	2009–10
55 (8 sixes and 47 fours)	Rilee Rossouw (319)	Eagles v Titans at Centurion	2009–10
There have been higher proportions of boundaries in an innings. In 2004 Thilina Kandamby playing for Sri Lankans against Zimbabwe A at Harare scored 52 including 10 fours and 2 sixes. At Leicester in 2006 Mark Pettini of Essex, facing Leicestershire "bowlers" who were giving away runs in order to contrive a positive result, hit 114* including 12 fours and 11 sixes (Essex lost). The most sixes in an innings is 26, achieved by Tanmay Agarwal (innings listed above). 26 sixes is also the most ever hit by a batter in a match.
Source: Wisden 2011. Last updated: 10 April 2025.

==== Most triple-centuries ====
Qualification: 3. Includes all scores of 300 or more. Entries in bold are for batters still playing first-class cricket.

Triple-centuries	Player	Matches	Career span
6	Donald Bradman (two for Australia, two for New South Wales and two for South Australia)	234	from 1927–28 to 1948–49
4	Bill Ponsford (all for Victoria)	162	from 1920–21 to 1934–35
4	Wally Hammond (one for England and three for Gloucestershire)	634	from 1920 to 1951
3	W. G. Grace (two for Gloucestershire and one for MCC)	870	from 1865 to 1908
3	Graeme Hick (all for Worcestershire)	526	from 1983–84 to 2008
3	Brian Lara (two for West Indies and one for Warwickshire)	259	from 1987–88 to 2006–07
3	Mike Hussey (all for Northamptonshire)	273	from 1994–95 to 2012–13
**3**	**Ravindra Jadeja** (all for Saurashtra)	134	from 2006–07 to present
**3**	**Cheteshwar Pujara** (two for Saurashtra and one for India A)	275	from 2005–06 to present
Source: Wisden 2006 and ACS. Last updated: 31 December 2024.

==== Most double-centuries ====
Qualification: 15. Includes all scores of 200 or more.

Entry in bold denotes player still playing first-class cricket.

Double-centuries	Player	Matches	Career span
37	Donald Bradman (twelve for Australia in Test matches, seven for touring Australian sides, eight for New South Wales, eight for South Australia, one for WM Woodfull's XI and one for DG Bradman's XI)	234	from 1927–28 to 1948–49
36	Wally Hammond (seven for England in Test matches, twenty-four for Gloucestershire, five for touring MCC sides)	634	from 1920 to 1951
22	Patsy Hendren (one for England in a Test match, four for touring MCC sides, fifteen for Middlesex and two for MCC)	833	from 1907 to 1938
**18**	**Cheteshwar Pujara** (three for India in Test matches, two for India A, one for India Blue in the Duleep Trophy final, nine for Saurashtra and three for Sussex)	**275**	**from 2006 to present**
17	Mark Ramprakash (five for Middlesex and twelve for Surrey)	461	from 1987 to 2012
17	Herbert Sutcliffe (sixteen for Yorkshire and one for England in a Test trial)	754	from 1919 to 1945
16	C. B. Fry (thirteen for Sussex, two for Hampshire and one for Gentlemen)	394	from 1892 to 1921–22
16	Jack Hobbs (one for England in a Test match, thirteen for Surrey, one for Players and one for Rest of England)	834	from 1905 to 1934
16	Graeme Hick (fourteen for Worcestershire, one for Zimbabweans and one for Northern Districts)	526	from 1983–84 to 2008
Source: Wisden 2006 and ACS. Last updated: 31 December 2024.

==== Most centuries ====
Qualification: 115.

Centuries	Player	Matches	Career span
199	Jack Hobbs including 15 for England in Test matches, 12 for touring representative MCC teams, 144 for Surrey, and 16 for Players v Gentlemen	834	from 1905 to 1934
170	Patsy Hendren including 7 for England in Test matches, 16 for touring representative MCC teams, 119 for Middlesex, and 13 for MCC	833	from 1907 to 1938
167	Wally Hammond including 22 for England in Test matches, 20 for touring representative MCC teams, and 113 for Gloucestershire	634	from 1920 to 1951
153	Phil Mead including 4 for England in Test matches, 3 for touring representative MCC teams, and 138 for Hampshire	814	from 1905 to 1936
151	Herbert Sutcliffe including 16 for England in Test matches, 7 for touring representative MCC teams, and 112 for Yorkshire	754	from 1919 to 1945
151	Geoffrey Boycott including 22 for England in Test matches, 13 for touring representative MCC teams, and 103 for Yorkshire	609	from 1962 to 1986
145	Frank Woolley including 5 for England in Test matches, 7 for touring representative MCC teams, and 122 for Kent	978	from 1906 to 1938
136	Graeme Hick including 6 for England in Test matches, 7 for touring representative England teams, 106 for Worcestershire, and 10 for Northern Districts	526	from 1983–84 to 2008
129	Len Hutton including 19 for England in Test matches, 18 for touring representative MCC teams, and 85 for Yorkshire	513	from 1934 to 1960
128	Graham Gooch including 20 for England in Test matches, 8 for official touring representative England teams, and 94 for Essex	581	from 1973 to 1997 (plus one match in 2000)
124	W. G. Grace (see List of first-class cricket centuries by W. G. Grace) including 2 for England in Test matches, 19 for MCC teams, 52 for Gloucestershire, 7 for London County, and 15 for Gentlemen v Players	870	from 1865 to 1908
123	Denis Compton including 17 for England in Test matches, 20 for touring representative MCC teams, and 67 for Middlesex	515	from 1936 to 1958 (plus occasional matches to 1964)
122	Tom Graveney including 11 for England in Test matches, 16 for touring representative MCC teams, 50 for Gloucestershire, and 27 for Worcestershire	732	from 1948 to 1971–72
117	Donald Bradman including 29 for Australia in Test matches, 30 for touring representative Australian teams or representative Australian teams against touring representative teams, 21 for New South Wales, and 25 for South Australia	234	from 1927–28 to 1948 (plus occasional matches in 1948–49)
The following also achieved 100 centuries. Viv Richards (114), Mark Ramprakash (114), Zaheer Abbas (108), Andy Sandham (107), Colin Cowdrey (107), Tom Hayward (104), Glenn Turner (103), John Edrich (103), Ernest Tyldesley (102), Les Ames (102), Dennis Amiss (102).
Source: Wisden 2006 and CricketArchive. Last updated: 9 July 2012.

==== Ineffective batters ====
Many cricketers with short first-class careers fail to ever score a run, and finish with a batting average of 0.00. Seymour Clark (a wicket-keeper for Somerset in the 1930 season) is believed to hold the record for most innings in a scoreless career with nine innings in his five matches, including seven ducks. The record for most matches in a career without ever scoring is believed to belong to John Howarth (a Nottinghamshire fast-medium bowler in the 1960s), whose thirteen matches included seven innings and four ducks.

The longest sequence of consecutive scoreless innings is 12 by Mark Robinson for Northamptonshire in 1990, whose scores that season were 1*, 0*, 1, 0, 0*, 0*, 0*, 0*, 0*, 0, 0, 0, 0*, 0*, 0 and 1*.

The most consecutive single-figure innings by a batter is 71, which has occurred twice. The first occurrence was by Jem Shaw who played chiefly for Nottinghamshire and the All England Eleven between his first-class debut on 26 June 1865 against Surrey with a score of 9, which he did not surpass until scoring 15 in the second innings of his last match of 1870 for Richard Daft’s XI against the United North of England Eleven. This was equalled by Eric Hollies of Warwickshire and England between 20 July 1948, when he made 12 not out against Glamorgan, and 16 August 1950, when he made 14 against Nottinghamshire. Hollies also holds the record for most consecutive innings without reaching 20, playing a total of 284 innings between 23 August 1939 when he made 22 against Gloucestershire and 19 May 1954, when he almost doubled his previous highest first-class score in making 47 against Sussex. Billy Bestwick of Derbyshire did not reach 20 in his last 258 first-class innings after making 20 against Warwickshire on 9 August 1906.

The lowest career batting average by a player with more than fifty first-class matches is almost certainly 2.63 by Francis McHugh of Yorkshire (three matches) and Gloucestershire (92 matches) between 1949 and 1956. McHugh batted in 111 innings for only 179 runs, with only four double figure scores. No other regular first-class cricketer is known to have had a batting average of under 3.00.

=== Individual records (bowling) ===
==== Most wickets in a career ====
Qualification: 2,400.

Wickets	Player	Matches	Average	Career span
4,204 wickets	Wilfred Rhodes (Yorkshire and England)	1110	16.72	from 1898 to 1930
3,776 wickets	Tich Freeman (Kent and England)	592	18.42	from 1914 to 1936
3,278 wickets	Charlie Parker (Gloucestershire and England)	635	19.46	from 1903 to 1935
3,061 wickets	Jack Hearne (Middlesex and England)	639	17.75	from 1888 to 1914 (plus one match in 1921 and another in 1923)
2,979 wickets	Tom Goddard (Gloucestershire and England)	593	19.84	from 1922 to 1952
2,874 wickets	Alec Kennedy (Hampshire and England)	677	21.23	from 1907 to 1936
2,857 wickets	Derek Shackleton (Hampshire and England)	647	18.65	from 1948 to 1969
2,844 wickets	Tony Lock (Surrey, Leicestershire, England and Western Australia)	654	19.23	from 1946 to 1970–71
2,830 wickets	Fred Titmus (Middlesex and England)	792	22.37	from 1949 to 1980 (plus one match in 1982)
2,809 wickets	W. G. Grace (Gloucestershire, London County and England)	870	18.14	from 1865 to 1908
2,784 wickets	Maurice Tate (Sussex and England)	679	18.16	from 1912 to 1937
2,742 wickets	George Hirst (Yorkshire and England)	826	18.73	from 1891 to 1921–2 (plus one match in 1929)
2,503 wickets	Colin "Charlie" Blythe (Kent and England)	439	16.81	from 1899 to 1914
2,465 wickets	Derek Underwood (Kent and England)	676	20.28	from 1963 to 1987
2,432 wickets	Ewart Astill (Leicestershire and England)	733	23.76	from 1906 to 1939
Source: Cricket Archive. Last updated: 8 June 2006.

==== Most wickets in a season ====
Qualification: 275 wickets.

Wickets	Player	Average	Season
304	Tich Freeman (England, Kent and Players)	18.05	1928
298	Tich Freeman (England, Kent, Players and South of England)	15.26	1933
290	Tom Richardson (Surrey, Players and South of England)	14.37	1895
283	Charles Turner (Australians)	11.68	1888
276	Tich Freeman (England, Kent and Players)	15.60	1931
275	Tich Freeman (England, Kent, Players and South of England)	16.84	1930
Remarkably, Freeman took 250 wickets or more in England in 1928, 1929, 1930, 1931, 1932 and 1933. These records may never be beaten, because fewer first-class matches are played nowadays.
Source: Cricket Archive. Last updated: 16 August 2005.

==== Best figures in an innings ====
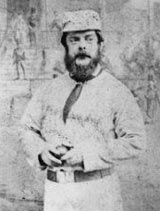
John Wisden, who in one innings clean bowled all ten South of England batters in 1850

The most wickets possible in an eleven-a-side innings is ten, and this has been achieved on a number of occasions. The first to do so was Edmund Hinkly in 1848 for Kent v England at Lord's. Perhaps the most famous early instance was two years later, when John Wisden, playing for the North of England v South of England at Lord's in 1850, clean bowled all ten South batters. In these early matches, the number of runs scored off each bowler was not recorded. The only other all-ten analysis not to contain any direct assistance from a fielder was by Eric Hollies, who got seven Nottinghamshire batters out clean bowled and three leg before wicket in his ten for 49 for Warwickshire v Nottinghamshire at Edgbaston, Birmingham in 1946.

The cheapest all-ten (and therefore the best innings bowling analysis in first-class cricket) was achieved by Hedley Verity in 1932 at Headingley, when he took ten for 10 for Yorkshire against Nottinghamshire. The most expensive all-ten recorded was ten for 175 by Eddie Hemmings playing for a touring International XI against a West Indies XI at Sabina Park, Kingston, Jamaica in 1982.

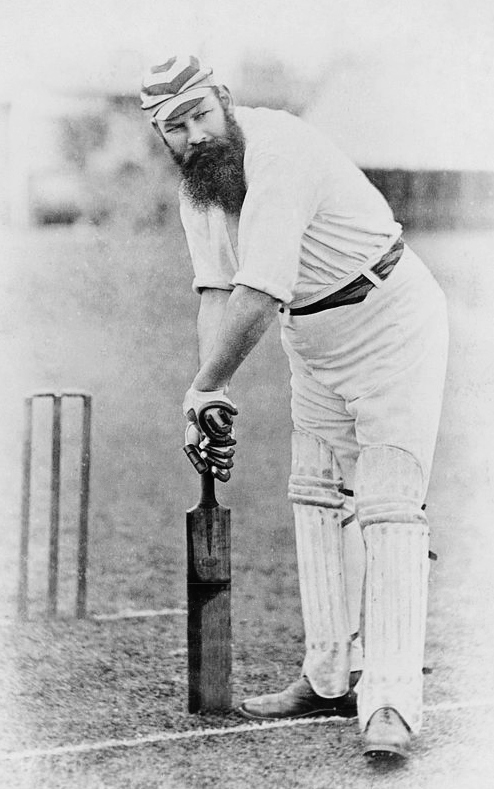
W. G. Grace, 54,000 runs and 2,800 wickets, and a cricketing stalwart of the Victorian era

The only bowlers to take all ten wickets in an innings more than once were Tich Freeman (three times in 1929, 1930 and 1931), John Wisden (twice, in 1850 and 1851), Vyell Walker (1859 and 1865), Hedley Verity (twice, 1931 and 1932), and Jim Laker (twice, both against the 1956 Australians). W. G. Grace also achieved a ten-for analysis twice, in 1873 and 1886; on the first occasion, he also scored a century, but the second occasion was in a twelve-a-side match.

==== Best figures in a match ====
The most wickets ever taken in a first-class match is nineteen, by Jim Laker for England against Australia at Old Trafford, Manchester in 1956, in the fourth Test match of that year's Ashes series. His figures were nine for 37 in Australia's first innings, and ten for 53 in their second.

Laker's feat has never been paralleled in first-class cricket. Eighteen wickets in a match was achieved by William Lillywhite for eleven Players against sixteen Gentlemen at Lord's in 1837, and by Henry Arkwright for MCC against Kent in a 12-a-side match at Canterbury in 1861, but seventeen is the most otherwise recorded in an eleven-a-side match. Apart from Laker's, there have only been two instances of seventeen wickets in a match since World War II, by John Davison for Canada against United States of America in an ICC Intercontinental Cup match in 2004, and Kyle Abbott for Hampshire against Somerset in the First Division of the County Championship in 2019.

==== Five wickets in an innings ====
Individual bowlers take great credit if they can capture five or more wickets in an innings. The earliest known instance of this was by William Bullen, who bowled five batters out when playing for England v Hampshire at Sevenoaks Vine in 1774. Scorecards were still uncommon at the time and bowling analyses were incomplete; bowlers were only credited with "bowled" victims, catches being awarded to the fielder only.

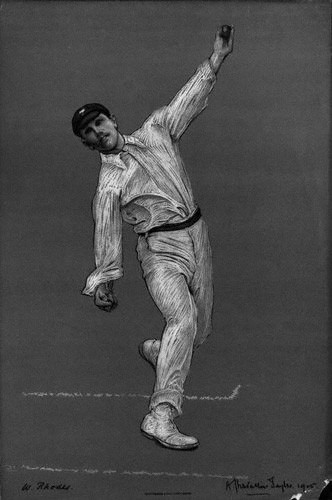
Wilfred Rhodes, an outstanding all rounder: he took more wickets than anyone else, and also regularly opened the batting for England

Tich Freeman took five wickets in an innings a record 386 times. Wilfred Rhodes achieved it 287 times.

==== Ten wickets in a match ====
It is a notable achievement for a bowler to capture 10 wickets in a match, and the feat is usually highlighted in career statistics. The earliest known instance was by Thomas Brett of Hampshire against Surrey at Laleham Burway in 1775. Brett's victims were "all bowled" as he was not credited with wickets falling to catches. He took seven in the first innings and four in the second (but Surrey still won by 69 runs).

Tich Freeman took ten wickets in a match a record 140 times. Charlie Parker achieved it 91 times.

==== Hat-tricks ====
A hat-trick is when a bowler takes three wickets from three consecutive deliveries. Doug Wright achieved the most hat-tricks in first-class cricket with seven. Tom Goddard and Charlie Parker each took six. In 2019–20, Ravi Yadav uniquely took a hat-trick in his first over on first-class debut, for Madhya Pradesh against Uttar Pradesh in the Ranji Trophy.

In 1907, Albert Trott of Middlesex took four wickets in four balls, and another hat-trick, in the same Somerset innings. In 1963–64, Joginder Rao playing for Services took two hat-tricks in the same Northern Punjab innings during his second first-class match, after having also taken a hat-trick in his début match. Other instances of two hat-tricks in a match have been achieved by Alfred Shaw (in 1884), Jimmy Matthews (1912 in a Test match), Charlie Parker (1924), Roly Jenkins (1949), Amin Lakhani (1978–79), and Mitchell Starc (2017–18).

Five wickets in five balls has been achieved once, by Brett Randell for Central Districts against Northern Districts in a 2026 Plunkett Shield match: he took a wicket with the last ball of his second over, and then four wickets with the first four of his third. A close instance came in 1925, when CWL Parker struck the stumps with five successive deliveries for Gloucestershire against Yorkshire. The second, however, was called a no-ball, so only four wickets were actually taken, including the hat-trick from the 3rd to 5th deliveries. Five wickets in six balls has been achieved five times, by Bill Copson for Derbyshire against Warwickshire in 1937, by William Henderson for North East Transvaal against Orange Free State at Bloemfontein in 1937–38, by Pat Pocock for Surrey against Sussex at Eastbourne in 1972, by Yasir Arafat for Rawalpindi against Faisalabad at Rawalpindi in 2004–05, and by Neil Wagner for Otago against Wellington in 2010–11. Wagner took five wickets in the over, a world's first. Rendell's spell included six wickets in eight balls; Pocock's spell included seven wickets in eleven balls, both records.

The rare achievement of four wickets in four balls was first accomplished by Joseph Wells (father of science fiction author H. G. Wells) for Kent against Sussex in 1862. Alan Walker, for Nottinghamshire in 1956, uniquely took the last wicket of Leicestershire's first innings, and a hat-trick with the first three balls of their second innings. Bob Crisp is the only player to take four wickets in four balls on two occasions.

=== Individual records (all-rounders) ===
An all-rounder excels at more than one discipline, usually both batting and bowling. Wicket-keeping all-rounders are effective batters and effective wicket-keepers.

==== Career all-rounders ====
Qualification: 22,000 runs and 1,100 wickets.

Player	Runs	Wickets	Matches	Career span
Frank Woolley (Kent and England)	58,959 (average 40.77)	2,066 (average 19.87); Woolley also took 1,018 catches	978	from 1906 to 1938
W. G. Grace (Gloucestershire, London County, and England)	54,211 (average 39.45)	2,809 (average 18.14)	870	from 1865 to 1908
Wilfred Rhodes (Yorkshire and England)	39,969 (average 30.81)	4,204 (average 16.72)	1,110	from 1898 to 1930
Jack Hearne (John William Hearne) (Middlesex and England)	37,252 (average 40.98)	1,839 (average 24.42)	647	from 1909 to 1936
George Herbert Hirst (Yorkshire and England)	36,356 (average 34.13)	2,742 (average 18.73)	826	from 1891 to 1921 (plus one match in 1929)
Brian Close (Yorkshire, Somerset and England)	34,994 (average 33.26)	1,171 (average 26.42)	786	from 1949 to 1977 (plus occasional matches to 1986)
James Langridge (Sussex and England)	31,716 (average 35.20)	1,530 (average 22.56)	695	from 1924 to 1953
Trevor Bailey (Essex and England)	28,641 (average 33.42)	2,082 (average 23.13)	682	from 1945 to 1967
John King (Leicestershire)	25,122 (average 27.33)	1,204 (average 25.17)	552	from 1895 to 1925
John Gunn (Nottinghamshire and England)	24,557 (average 33.18)	1,242 (average 24.52)	535	from 1896 to 1925 (plus occasional matches to 1932)
Johnny Douglas (Essex and England)	24,531 (average 27.90)	1,893 (average 23.32)	651	from 1901 to 1930
Ray Illingworth (Yorkshire, Leicestershire and England)	24,134 (average 28.06)	2,072 (average 20.27)	787	from 1951 to 1983
Vallance Jupp (Sussex, Northamptonshire and England)	23,296 (average 29.41)	1,658 (average 23.01)	529	from 1909 to 1938
Ewart Astill (Leicestershire and England)	22,735 (average 22.55)	2,432 (average 23.76)	733	from 1906 to 1939
Albert Relf (Sussex and England)	22,238 (average 26.79)	1,897 (average 20.94)	565	from 1900 to 1921
In addition to the above, Fred Titmus, Garfield Sobers, Mike Procter, Maurice Tate and Peter Sainsbury all achieved 20,000 runs and 1,000 wickets
Source: Cricket Archive. Last updated: 13 March 2007.

==== Career wicket-keeping all-rounders ====
Qualification: 20,000 runs and 1,000 dismissals.

Player	Runs	Dismissals	Matches	Career span
Jim Parks (Sussex, Somerset and England)	36,673 (average 34.76)	1,181 (1,088 c, 93 st)	739	from 1949 to 1976
Les Ames (Kent and England)	37,248 (average 43.51)	1,121 (703 c, 418 st)	593	from 1926 to 1951
Source: Cricket Archive and Cricinfo. Last updated: 12 March 2007.

=== Individual records (wicket-keepers) ===
==== Most dismissals (catches plus stumpings) in a career ====
Qualification: 1,100.

Dismissals	Player	Matches	Career span
1,649 (1,473 caught, 176 stumped)	Bob Taylor (Derbyshire and England)	639	from 1960 to 1988
1,527 (1,270 c, 257 st)	John Murray (Middlesex and England)	635	from 1952 to 1975
1,497 (1,242 c, 255 st)	Bert Strudwick (Surrey and England)	675	from 1902 to 1927
1,344 (1,211 c, 133 st)	Alan Knott (Kent and England)	511	from 1964 to 1985
1,320 (1,192 c, 128 st)	Jack Russell (Gloucestershire and England)	465	from 1981 to 2004
1,310 (933 c, 377 st)	Fred Huish (Kent)	497	from 1895 to 1914
1,294 (1,083 c, 211 st)	Brian Taylor (Essex)	572	from 1949 to 1973
1,263 (1,139 c, 124 st)	Steve Rhodes (Worcestershire and England)	440	from 1981 to 2004
1,253 (906 c, 347 st)	David Hunter (Yorkshire)	548	from 1889 to 1909
1,228 (953 c, 275 st)	Harry Butt (Sussex and England)	550	from 1890 to 1912
1,207 (852 c, 355 st)	Jack Board (London County, Gloucestershire, England and Hawke's Bay)	525	from 1891 to 1914–15
1,206 (904 c, 302 st)	Harry Elliott (Derbyshire and England)	532	from 1920 to 1947
1,181 (1,088 c, 93 st)	Jim Parks (Sussex, Somerset and England)	739	from 1949 to 1976
1,126 (948 c, 178 st)	Roy Booth (Yorkshire and Worcestershire)	468	from 1951 to 1970
1,121 (703 c, 418 st)	Les Ames (Kent and England)	593	from 1926 to 1951
Ames achieved the most dismissals in a season with 128 in 1929. The most dismissals in a match is 14 (7 in each innings, 11 caught and 3 stumped) by Ibrahim Khaleel for Hyderabad (India) against Assam at Guwahati in 2011–12. The only wicket-keepers to dismiss 9 batters in an innings are Tahir Rasheed (8 caught and 1 stumped) for Habib Bank against Pakistan Automobiles Corporation at Gujranwala in 1992–93 and Wayne James (7 caught and 2 stumped) for Matabeleland against Mashonaland Country Districts at Bulawayo in 1995–96 (he also scored 99 and 99* in the same match).
Source: Wisden 2008. Last updated: 27 November 2011.

==== Most stumpings in a career ====
Qualification: 300.

Stumpings	Player	Matches	Career span
418	Les Ames (Kent and England)	593	from 1926 to 1951
377	Fred Huish (Kent)	497	from 1895 to 1914
358	Ted Pooley (Middlesex and Surrey)	370	from 1861 to 1883
355	Jack Board (London County, Gloucestershire, England and Hawke's Bay)	525	from 1891 to 1914–15
347	David Hunter (Yorkshire)	548	from 1889 to 1909
343	George Duckworth (Lancashire and England)	504	from 1923 to 1938
341	Tich Cornford (Sussex and England)	496	from 1921 to 1947
334	Harold Stephenson (Somerset)	463	from 1948 to 1964
322	Fred Price (Middlesex and England)	402	from 1926 to 1947
302	Harry Elliott (Derbyshire and England)	532	from 1920 to 1947
Ames achieved the most stumpings in a season with 64 in 1932.
Source: Wisden 2008 and https://cricketarchive.com. Last updated: 3 May 2008.

=== Individual records (fielding) ===
==== Most catches in a career ====
Qualification: 640 catches.

Catches	Player	Matches	Career span
1,018	Frank Woolley (Kent and England)	978	from 1906 to 1938
876	W. G. Grace (Gloucestershire, London County and England)	870	from 1865 to 1908
831	Tony Lock (Surrey, Leicestershire, England and Western Australia)	654	from 1946 to 1970–71
820^{†}	Wally Hammond (Gloucestershire and England)	634	from 1920 to 1951
813^{†}	Brian Close (Yorkshire, Somerset and England)	786	from 1949 to 1986
788	John Langridge (Sussex)	574	from 1928 to 1955
765	Wilfred Rhodes (Yorkshire and England)	1110	from 1899 to 1929–30
760	Arthur Milton (Gloucestershire and England)	620	from 1948 to 1974
759	Patsy Hendren (Middlesex and England)	833	from 1907 to 1938
709	Graeme Hick (Worcestershire, England, Zimbabwe, Queensland and Northern Districts)	526	from 1983–84 to 2008
697	Peter Walker (Glamorgan and England)	469	from 1956 to 1972
694	John Tunnicliffe (Yorkshire)	498	from 1891 to 1907
675	James Seymour (London County and Kent)	553	from 1900 to 1926
675	Phil Mead (Hampshire and England)	814	from 1905 to 1936
644	Keith Fletcher (Essex and England)	730	from 1962 to 1988
^{†}Hammond also made 3 stumpings, Close made 1.
Hammond achieved the most catches in a season: 79 in 1928 — that season he also took the most catches in a match: 10 for Gloucestershire against Surrey at Cheltenham (he also scored 139 and 143 in the same match). The most catches in an innings is 7, by Micky Stewart for Surrey against Northamptonshire at Northampton in 1957, by Tony Brown for Gloucestershire against Nottinghamshire at Nottingham in 1966, and by Rikki Clarke for Warwickshire against Lancashire at Liverpool in 2011.
Source: Cricinfo and https://cricketarchive.com. Last updated: 4 August 2011.

=== Individual records (other) ===
==== Most matches played ====
Qualification: 750.

Matches	Player	Career span
1110	Wilfred Rhodes (Yorkshire and England)	from 1898 to 1930
978	Frank Woolley (Kent and England)	from 1906 to 1938
870	W. G. Grace (Gloucestershire, London County and England)	from 1865 to 1908
834	Jack Hobbs (Surrey and England)	from 1905 to 1934
833	Patsy Hendren (Middlesex and England)	from 1907 to 1938
826	George Herbert Hirst (Yorkshire and England)	from 1891 to 1929
814	Phil Mead (Hampshire and England)	from 1905 to 1936
792	Fred Titmus (Middlesex and England)	from 1949 to 1980
787	Ray Illingworth (Yorkshire, Leicestershire and England)	from 1951 to 1983
786	Brian Close (Yorkshire and England)	from 1949 to 1986
754	Herbert Sutcliffe (Yorkshire and England)	from 1919 to 1945
Source: Cricinfo. Last updated: 22 May 2006.

== Partnership records ==
=== Highest partnerships ===
Qualification: 480.

Runs	Players	Opposition	Venue	Season
624 (3rd wicket)	Kumar Sangakkara & Mahela Jayawardene (Sri Lanka)	v South Africa	Colombo	2006
606* (3rd wicket)	Kashyap Bakle & Snehal Kauthankar (Goa)	v Arunachal Pradesh	Porvorim	2024–25
594* (3rd wicket)	Swapnil Gugale and Ankit Bawne (Maharashtra)	v Delhi	Mumbai	2016–17
580 (2nd wicket)	Rafatullah Mohmand & Aamer Sajjad (Water and Power Development Authority)	v Sui Southern Gas Company	Sheikhupura Stadium	2009–10
577 (4th wicket)	Vijay Hazare & Gul Mohammad (Baroda)	v Holkar	Baroda	1946–47
576 (2nd wicket)	Sanath Jayasuriya & Roshan Mahanama (Sri Lanka)	v India	Colombo	1997–98
574* (4th wicket)	Clyde Walcott & Frank Worrell (Barbados)	v Trinidad	Port-of-Spain	1945–46
561 (1st wicket)	Waheed Mirza & Mansoor Akhtar (Karachi Whites)	v Quetta	Karachi	1976–77
555 (1st wicket)	Percy Holmes & Herbert Sutcliffe (Yorkshire)	v Essex	Leyton	1932
554 (1st wicket)	Jack Brown & John Tunnicliffe (Yorkshire)	v Derbyshire	Chesterfield	1898
539 (3rd wicket)	Sagar Jogiyani & Ravindra Jadeja (Saurashtra)	v Gujarat	Surat	2012–13
538 (4rd wicket)	Babul Kumar & Sakibul Gani (Bihar)	v Mizoram	Kolkota	2021–22
523 (3rd wicket)	Michael Carberry & Neil McKenzie (Hampshire)	v Yorkshire	Southampton	2011
520* (5th wicket)	Cheteshwar Pujara & Ravindra Jadeja (Saurashtra)	v Orissa	Rajkot	2008–09
503 (1st wicket)	Aaron Finch & Ryan Carters (Cricket Australia XI)	v New Zealanders	Sydney	2015–16
502* (4th wicket)	Frank Worrell & John Goddard (Barbados)	v Trinidad	Bridgetown, Barbados	1943–44
501 (3rd wicket)	Alviro Petersen & Ashwell Prince (Lancashire)	v Glamorgan	Colwyn Bay	2015
494 (5th wicket)	Marshall Ayub & Mehrab Hossain, Jr. (Central Zone)	v East Zone	Bogra	2012–13
490 (1st wicket)	Ted Bowley & John Langridge (Sussex)	v Middlesex	Hove	1933
487* (6th wicket)	George Headley & Clarence Passailaigue (Jamaica)	v Lord Tennyson's XI	Kingston, Jamaica	1931–32
486 (1st wicket)	Will Pucovski & Marcus Harris (Victoria)	v South Australia	Glenelg	2020–21
485 (1st wicket)	Yaseen Valli & Andrea Agathangelou (Easterns)	v Boland	Paarl	2019–20
480 (2nd wicket)	Dean Elgar & Rilee Rossouw (Eagles)	v Titans	Centurion	2009–10
The highest partnerships for the wickets not listed above are
460 (7th wicket)	Bhupinder Singh jnr & Pankaj Dharmani (Punjab)	v Delhi	Delhi	1994–95
433 (8th wicket)	Arthur Sims & Victor Trumper (Australians)	v Canterbury	Christchurch	1913–14
283 (9th wicket)	Arnold Warren & John Chapman (Derbyshire)	v Warwickshire	Blackwell	1910
307 (10th wicket)	Alan Kippax & Hal Hooker (New South Wales)	v Victoria	Melbourne	1928–29
Source: Wisden 2011. Last updated: 14 November 2024.
