= 1766 to 1770 in sports =

Events in world sport through the years 1766 to 1770.

== Bando ==
Events

- A game similar to bandy known in Wales as "bando", a term used in a dictionary by John Walters (published 1770 to 1794). Bando was particularly popular in the Cynffig-Margam district of the Vale of Glamorgan where wide stretches of sandy beaches afford ample room for play.

== Boxing ==
Events

- 21 May 1766 — In his first defence of the title, Juchau lost to Bill Darts at Guildford after forty minutes and 17 rounds.
- April 1767 — Jack Broughton defeated an unnamed opponent in Lambeth after 15 minutes.
- July 1767 — Darts defeated a bargeman called Doggett at Melksham after one hour and six rounds.
- 13 October 1767 — Darts defeated a butcher called Swansey at Epping Forest after fifteen minutes.
- 1769 — Tom Lyons defeated many minor opponents in street fights and in turn-ups in London.
- 1769 — Lyons received challenges from Darts and Peter Corcoran. He declined both and is believed to have retired. Darts reclaimed the English title.
- 27 June 1769 — Darts was defeated by Tom Lyons at Kingston-upon-Thames after 45 minutes.
- 4 July 1769 — Bill "The Nailer" Stevens defeated John McGuire in a 20-minute fight at Bloomsbury Fields.
- August 1769 — Bill Turner defeated Bill "The Nailer" Stevens in a 2-hour 10 minute fight in London.
- 4 September 1769 — Peter Corcoran defeated Bill Turner in London after an 11-round 20 minute fight. Some other sources say Bill Turner had won the fight.
- 25 March 1770 — Darts defeated Stephen "Death" Oliver in Putney after 27 minutes.
- 1770 — Peter Corcoran defeated Bob ("Bricklayer") Smiler and Tom Dalton in london. The length and round of the fights are unknown. Corcoran also defeated Joe Davis in Moorfields. The length and round of this fight is also unknown as well.

== Cricket ==
Events

- c.19 June 1766 — an inter-county match between Hampshire and Sussex was won by Hampshire; evidence exists that teams raised by the Hambledon Club were representative of both these counties.
- 1767 — the earliest known century partnership recorded as two Hambledon players score 192 for the first wicket against Caterham; the sources do not name the players but they are believed to have been Tom Sueter and either George Leer or Edward "Curry" Aburrow.
- 3 June 1768 — death of William Bedle at his home near Dartford; he "was formerly accounted the most expert cricket player in England" and is the first great player in cricket's history.
- 1768 — a newspaper report states that John Small "fetched above seven score notches off his own bat" when playing for Hampshire versus Kent at Broadhalfpenny Down; although it seems to be his second innings score, it may be his match total and so it is not certain if it is the earliest known first-class century.
- 1769 — first mentions in the sources of two of the greatest bowlers of the 18th century, Thomas Brett and Lumpy Stevens.
- 1769 — John Minshull scored 107 in a minor match and this is the earliest known century definitely recorded in any class of cricket.
- 1769 — Tom Sueter and George Leer shared a partnership of 128 for Hampshire v Surrey at Broadhalfpenny Down, the second known century partnership in cricket's history.
- 1770 — in the year of the so-called "Boston Massacre", which occurred on Monday, 5 March, there is a report in the Middlesex Journal on Thursday, 16 August that: "about three days before the meeting of Parliament, a grand Cricket Match will be played by 11 of the Ministry against 11 of the Patriots, when great sport is expected".

== Horse racing ==
Events

- 1770 – Eclipse retired undefeated after eighteen races

== Sources ==
- Buckley, G. B. (1935). Fresh Light on 18th Century Cricket. Cotterell.
