= 1777 English cricket season =

Cricket season review

In the 1777 English cricket season, James Aylward made his world record score of 167. The record stood until 1820. Details of ten historically important eleven-a-side matches, including one at single wicket, are known. (Note: Any match listed in the ACS' Important Match Guide (1981) is historically important, and therefore of the highest standard, whether or not a scorecard might exist. The same applies to numerous matches discovered by researchers since 1981. For further information, see First-class cricket.)

== James Aylward’s record score ==
Between 18 and 20 June, Hampshire played England on Sevenoaks Vine. England scored 166 and 69; but Hampshire scored 403 to win by an innings and 168 runs.

The highlight of the 1777 season was the innings of 167 by James Aylward which set a new record for the highest individual score, beating John Small's 136. In a contemporary report, it is stated that: "Aylward went in at 5 o'clock on Wednesday afternoon, and was not out till after three on Friday". The length of the innings in terms of actual minutes or deliveries is unknown, but it is clear that he batted during or through six sessions of play. The team total of 403 was a huge figure at the time; the second highest score in it was 46 by Tom Sueter, while five other batsmen scored 20-plus.

Aylward's record stood until 1820, when it was beaten by William Ward.

According to John Nyren, this game was definitely played with a three-stump wicket. The third stump was originally allowed in 1775, but it is evident that teams did not always take advantage of it, and many matches were played until the 1780s in which the standard two stumps were still in place.

== Hampshire v England ==
Aylward's match was the first of six between Hampshire and England. Besides Sevenoaks Vine, the venues were Broadhalfpenny Down (twice), Laleham Burway, Guildford Bason, and the Artillery Ground. In all, Hampshire won four of the matches, England won two.

The second match was played 7–10 July on Broadhalfpenny Down, and England won by 25 runs. England were all out for 60 in their first innings, and Hampshire replied with 194 to take a substantial first innings lead. England recovered to make 207 in their second innings with scores of 65 by Joseph Miller and 44 by William Yalden. Needing 74 to win, Hampshire were dismissed for 45. The teams met again, 22–26 July, on Laleham Burway, and Hampshire won by 30 runs after Thomas Brett took at least eight wickets (all bowled), and George Leer made the top score of 69.

The fourth match was played 18–20 August at Guildford Bason. Needing 167 in the fourth innings, Hampshire owed much to a fine 62 by Tom Taylor but were still several runs short when the last pair, Tom Sueter and Richard Nyren came together. Sueter ended with 9* and Nyren with 4* to earn a win by 1 wicket.

The last two matches were played in September: 8–10 on Broadhalfpenny Down, and 15–17 on the Artillery Ground. England with 146 and 187, against Hampshire's 117 and 162, won by 54 runs on the 10th. Hampshire with 187 and 212 won the last match by 131 runs; England scored 151 and 117.

== Dorset v Mann ==
John Sackville, 3rd Duke of Dorset and Sir Horatio Mann were the leading patrons of cricket at the time, and often competed against each other. The Duke of Dorset's XI and Sir Horatio Mann's XI played 16 to 18 July in Maidstone, and 28 to 30 July in Canterbury. In both matches, the stake was 100 guineas.

Mann's XI won by one wicket in Maidstone. Mann's team had been 52 runs down on first innings, and at least four runs were needed when the last wicket partnership began. The unusually worded dismissal of "knock down wkt", which happened twice in one innings, has been taken to mean hit wicket.

Mann's XI won by 21 runs in Canterbury. A notice beforehand warned spectators: "The company are particularly desired to bring no dogs, as they will be shot". Evidently there had been complaints about dogs running loose on the field in an earlier match at Bishopsbourne Paddock.

The Dorset/Mann teams of the period were both essentially Kent plus given men. Issues are always likely about the status of such games, but a clear majority of the players who took part were well enough known, and there can be no doubt that these were major fixtures. Confusion often arises from the titles as the games would be billed as West Kent v East Kent, or something more parochial. The Duke of Dorset generally used Sevenoaks in west Kent as his home venue, or Maidstone as in the game above; Sir Horace Mann was based at Bishopsbourne, which is near Canterbury in east Kent.

== Single wicket ==
On 29 May, there was a single wicket "fives" match on the Artillery Ground between Five of Hambledon and Five of England. Hambledon won by 15 runs. Of the ten Hambledon wickets that fell, four were caught by Francis Booker.

== Other events ==
On 9 and 10 June, the Chertsey and Coulsdon teams met on Sevenoaks Vine. Chertsey won by 6 wickets. Chertsey was led by the Earl of Tankerville and Robert Stone; Coulsdon by the Duke of Dorset and Mr (later Sir) Peter Burrell. It seems to have been a grand social occasion that was reported by both the Lloyd's Evening Post and the St James Chronicle in the next couple of days.

== First mentions ==
=== Players ===
- William Bedster (Surrey and Middlesex)
- Peter Burrell (Coulsdon)
- Robert Clifford (Kent)
- Richard Hosmer (Kent)
- Lamborn (Surrey and Hampshire)
- Noah Mann (Hampshire)
- William Pattenden (Kent)
- Richard Stanford (Kent)
- Townsend (Kent)

== Bibliography ==
- ACS (1981). A Guide to Important Cricket Matches Played in the British Isles 1709–1863. Nottingham: ACS. OCLC 85045528.
- Ashley-Cooper, F. S. (1929). Kent Cricket Matches, 1719–1880. Canterbury: Gibbs & Sons. OCLC 220674085.
- Buckley, G. B. (1935). Fresh Light on 18th Century Cricket. Birmingham: Cotterell & Co. OCLC 23450280.
- Haygarth, Arthur (1996) [1862]. Scores & Biographies, Volume 1 (1744–1826). Kennington: Frederick Lillywhite. ISBN 978-19-00592-23-9.
- Nyren, John (1998) [1832]. Mote, Ashley (ed.). The Cricketers of my Time. London: Robson Publishing. ISBN 978-18-61051-68-4.
