= 1776 English cricket season =

Cricket season review

According to Rowland Bowen, the earliest known scorecard templates were introduced in the 1776 English cricket season. These were printed by T. Pratt of Sevenoaks, and soon came into general use. Details of seven historically important eleven-a-side matches are known. (Note: Any match listed in the ACS' Important Match Guide (1981) is historically important, and therefore of the highest standard, whether or not a scorecard might exist. The same applies to numerous matches discovered by researchers since 1981. For further information, see First-class cricket.)

== Hampshire v Kent ==
Hampshire and Kent played each other four times in June and July.

=== 5 to 7 June ===
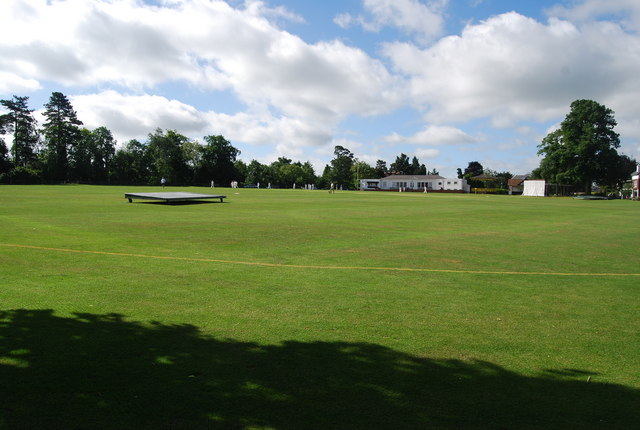
Sevenoaks Vine cricket ground.

The first match was on Moulsey Hurst, and Hampshire won by 152 runs. The stake was 500 guineas. Ten batters made scores of 30 or more, but no one reached 50. William Brazier top-scored with 49. John Small (38 and 44) scored the most runs in the match. The best bowlers were Richard May and Thomas Brett.

=== 25 and 26 June ===
Hampshire won the second match on Sevenoaks Vine by 75 runs. Hampshire scored 241 and 84; Kent in reply made 173 and 77. The highest individual innings was 70 by Richard Nyren. Haygarth commented that, in other accounts, Kent was called "England", but it was in fact Kent with Lumpy Stevens and Thomas White of Surrey as given men.

=== 2 to 4 July ===
The teams met again on Broadhalfpenny Down where Kent won by 4 wickets. Hampshire scored 87 (Lumpy 4w) and 221 (John Small 57, Richard Nyren 36; Thomas White 4w, Lumpy 3w); Kent made 163 (William Brazier 36, Duke of Dorset 34, William Bowra 31; Thomas Brett 3w) and 146/6 (John Boorman 38*, Thomas White 38; Richard Francis 4w). Hampshire used a substitute batsman in the second innings with Mr T. Davis replacing the injured Tom Brett, but he made only 0* so had little impact on the outcome.

The final day of the match was Thursday, 4 July 1776. Across the Atlantic, the Declaration of Independence was signed by the thirteen English colonies that formed the original United States of America.

=== 15 to 17 July ===
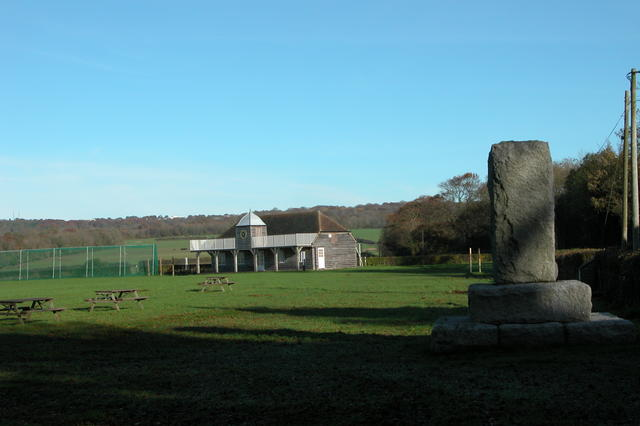
Broadhalfpenny Down

The teams returned to Sevenoaks Vine for their final match, which Hampshire won by 6 wickets. Kent scored 154 in their first innings, and dismissed Hampshire for 130. Hampshire's total included 59 not out by John Small. Kent were all out for 69 in the second innings, and Hampshire scored 94/4 to win, George Leer making 47*.

== Hampshire v England ==
From 22 to 24 July, Hampshire met England on the little-known Cheden Holt, which is just outside Hambledon. Hampshire scored 88 and 113; England scored 135 and 67/5 to win by 5 wickets. Haygarth was puzzled by the venue, which he recorded as Holt Common. He added that he 'cannot now say' if it was the usual Hambledon venue at Broadhalfpenny, or another place.

== Hampshire v Surrey ==
=== 6 to 8 August ===
Surrey hosted Hampshire over three days on Laleham Burway, and won the match by one wicket. Hampshire scored 94 and 176 (James Aylward 82*); Surrey scored 141 and 130/9. James Aylward normally opened the innings, so it is possible he carried his bat when making 82*. The match must have had an exciting finish as Surrey's two not out batsmen both scored 19.

=== 26 to 28 August ===
The teams played another three-day match on Broadhalfpenny Down. This time, Hampshire won by 198 runs. They batted first, and scored 273, of which John Small made 85 and James Aylward 45. Surrey were dismissed for 82, Richard Nyren taking a 5wI (five all bowled). Hampshire's second innings total was 155 (Aylward 59, Small 35), and they completed the match by dismissing Surrey for 148. Details were obtained from the Hampshire Chronicle.

== Other events ==
According to John Arlott in his Arlott on Cricket (quoting an unnamed source): 'On Wednesday, 19 June 1776, on Tichborne Down, Alresford with three of Waltham and two of Warnford v Petersfield and Catherington with the famous Messrs Small, Brett and Barber and H. Bonham Esq.' Arlott comments: 'Although no result is recorded, these matches, invariably played for wagers, were based on teams of more or less even strength; and to set three such eminent Hambledon players on the other team means that Alresford must have been immensely powerful'.

A notice in the Leicester Journal of 17 August is the earliest-known mention of cricket in Leicestershire.

On 19 August, London and Brentford were to play a match on the Artillery Ground, but no report has been found.

A notice about the Artillery Ground was published in the Morning Chronicle of Wednesday, 28 August. It reads: 'The old wall of the Artillery Ground extending from the end of Chiswell Street to the Bunhill Burial Ground is about to be pulled down and a new one built farther back, and in front of the new road a row of houses is to be erected'. See also 18 July in the 1761 season.

Coulsdon arranged two matches in September, against Chertsey and London, but neither has a known result.

The earliest known scorecard templates were introduced in 1776 by T. Pratt, a Sevenoaks printer, and soon came into general use.

== First mentions ==
=== Clubs and teams ===
- Alresford
- Petersfield and Catherington

=== Counties ===
- Leicestershire

=== Players ===
- Henry Bonham
- Richard Aubrey Veck

=== Venues ===
- Cheden Holt
- Tichborne Down

== Bibliography ==
- ACS (1981). A Guide to Important Cricket Matches Played in the British Isles 1709–1863. Nottingham: ACS. OCLC 85045528.
- Arlott, John (1984). Arlott on Cricket. London: Harper Collins. ISBN 978-00-02180-82-5.
- Ashley-Cooper, F. S. (1924). Hambledon Cricket Chronicle: 1772–1796. London: Jenkins. OCLC 38498574.
- Bowen, Rowland (1970). Cricket: A History of its Growth and Development. London: Eyre & Spottiswoode. ISBN 978-04-13278-60-9.
- Buckley, G. B. (1935). Fresh Light on 18th Century Cricket. Birmingham: Cotterell & Co. OCLC 23450280.
- Haygarth, Arthur (1996) [1862]. Scores & Biographies, Volume 1 (1744–1826). Kennington: Frederick Lillywhite. ISBN 978-19-00592-23-9.
- Waghorn, H. T. (2005) [1906]. The Dawn of Cricket. London: J. W. McKenzie. ISBN 978-09-47821-17-3.
