= Edward Aburrow =

Edward Aburrow may refer to:

- Edward Aburrow Sr (c. 1715–1763), mid-18th-century English cricketer
- Edward Aburrow Jr (1747–1835), English cricketer who played for the Hambledon Club

== See also ==
- Aburrow (surname)
