= Brian Boshier =

English cricketer

- Boshier in the early 1960s

Cricket information
- Batting: Right-handed
- Bowling: Right-arm medium

Career statistics
Competition	First-class
Matches	206
Runs scored	579
Batting average	4.32
100s/50s	0/0
Top score	30
Balls bowled	26,693
Wickets	530
Bowling average	23.03
5 wickets in innings	23
10 wickets in match	2
Best bowling	8/45
Catches/stumpings	56/–
- Source: CricketArchive, 19 April 2023

Brian Stanley Boshier (6 March 1932 – 2 September 2009) was an English cricketer who played first-class cricket for Leicestershire County Cricket Club between 1953 and 1964.

Boshier, a very tall right arm seam bowler, took 510 wickets in his first-class cricket career at an average of 23 runs per wicket. He was accurate in length and when conditions were helpful he used all of his 196 centimetres (6 feet 5 inches) to extract steep bounce.

Boshier took five wickets in an innings 23 times and recorded his best figures, 8/45, against Essex in 1957, besides also taking ten wickets in a match against Lancashire in 1960. Boshier took 108 wickets in 1958, the year he was awarded his county cap, and the same number, 108, in 1961, when he finished second in the English national bowling averages for the season, but failed so badly against the Australians that he was never considered for representative honours. The following year, a succession of injuries limited Boshier to ten games, and he never recovered from these setbacks, being released by Leicestershire at the end of 1964.

A "rabbit" with no pretensions to batting ability, Boshier scored just 579 runs at an average of 4.32. Only once, against Gloucestershire in 1957, did he even reach 20 in an innings. In 1955 Boshier played his first nine innings without even scoring a run, which equalled a record set by John Candler in 1894 and 1895 before being previously equalled by Tom Goddard in 1923 and Seymour Clark’s infamous 1930 stint with Somerset. Between August 1957 and July 1959 Boshier played fifty-two innings without reaching double figures.

He was born at Leicester and died on 2 September 2009 at the age of 77 at Masham, Yorkshire.
