= Century (cricket) =

Cricket score of 100 runs

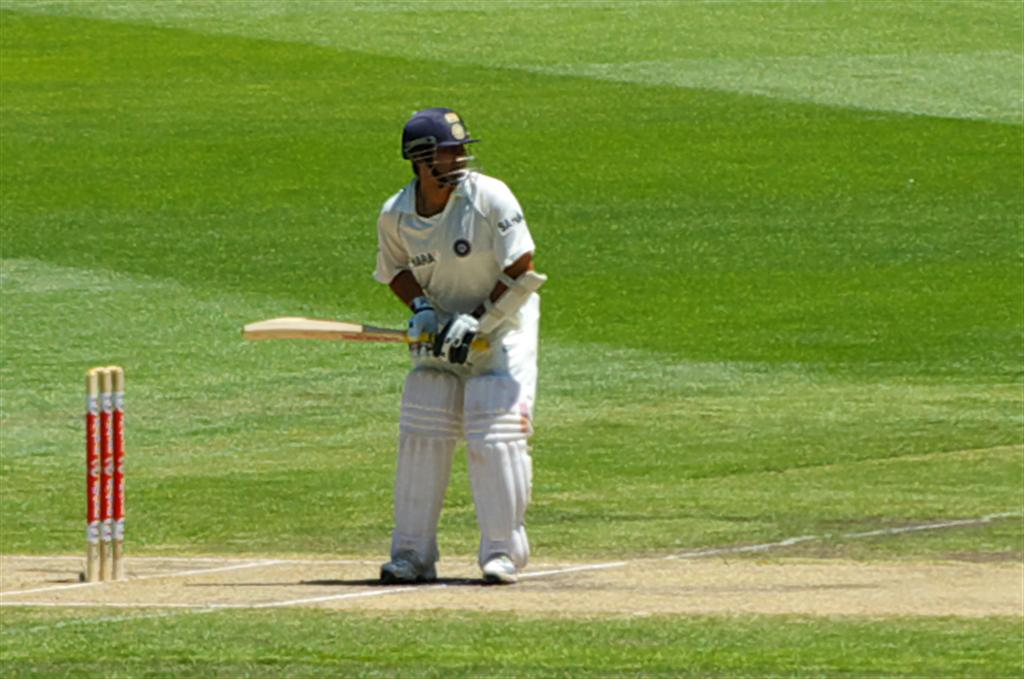
Sachin Tendulkar of India holds the record of highest number of runs and centuries scored in Test Cricket.

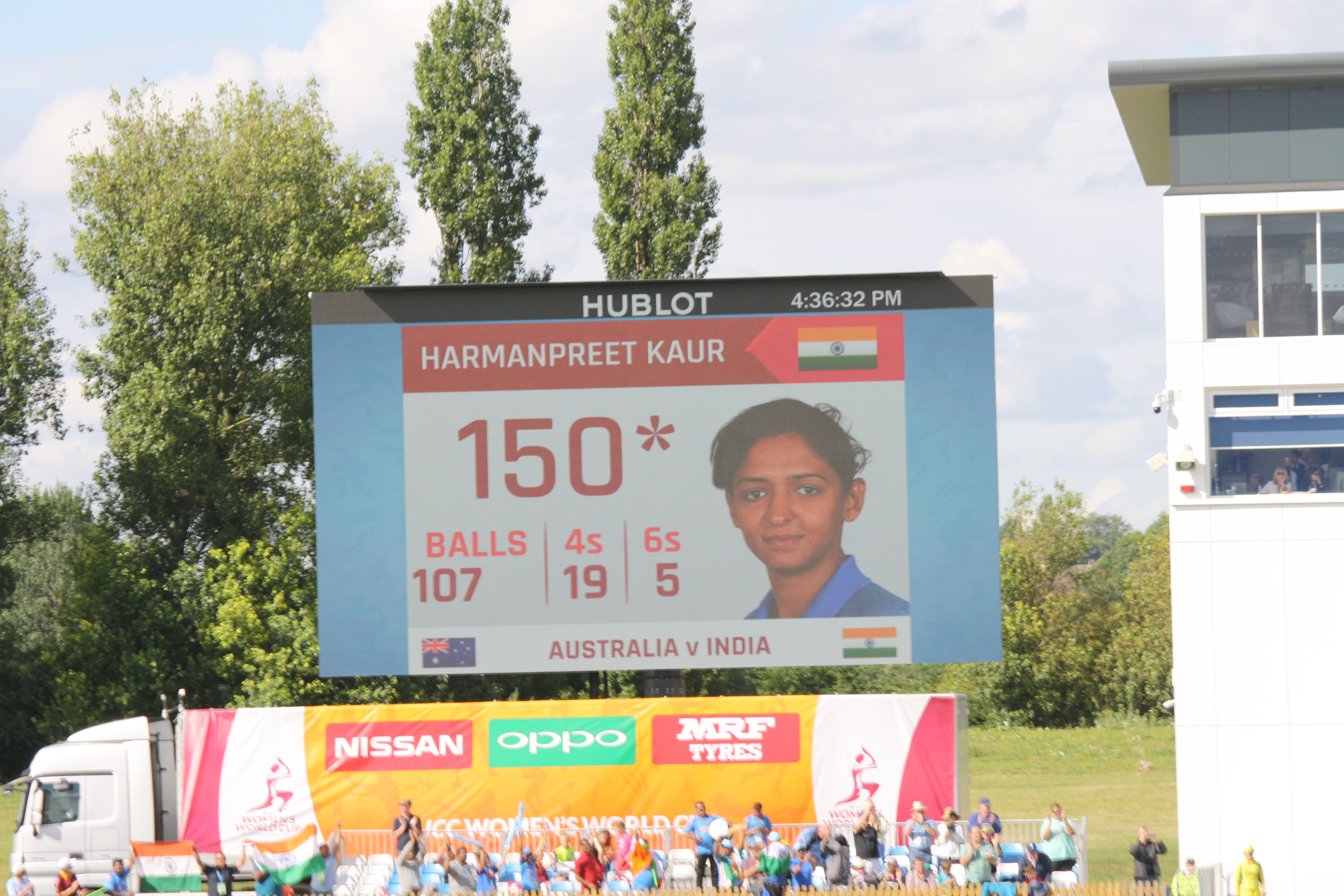
A big screen showing Harmanpreet Kaur reaching a score of 150 not out

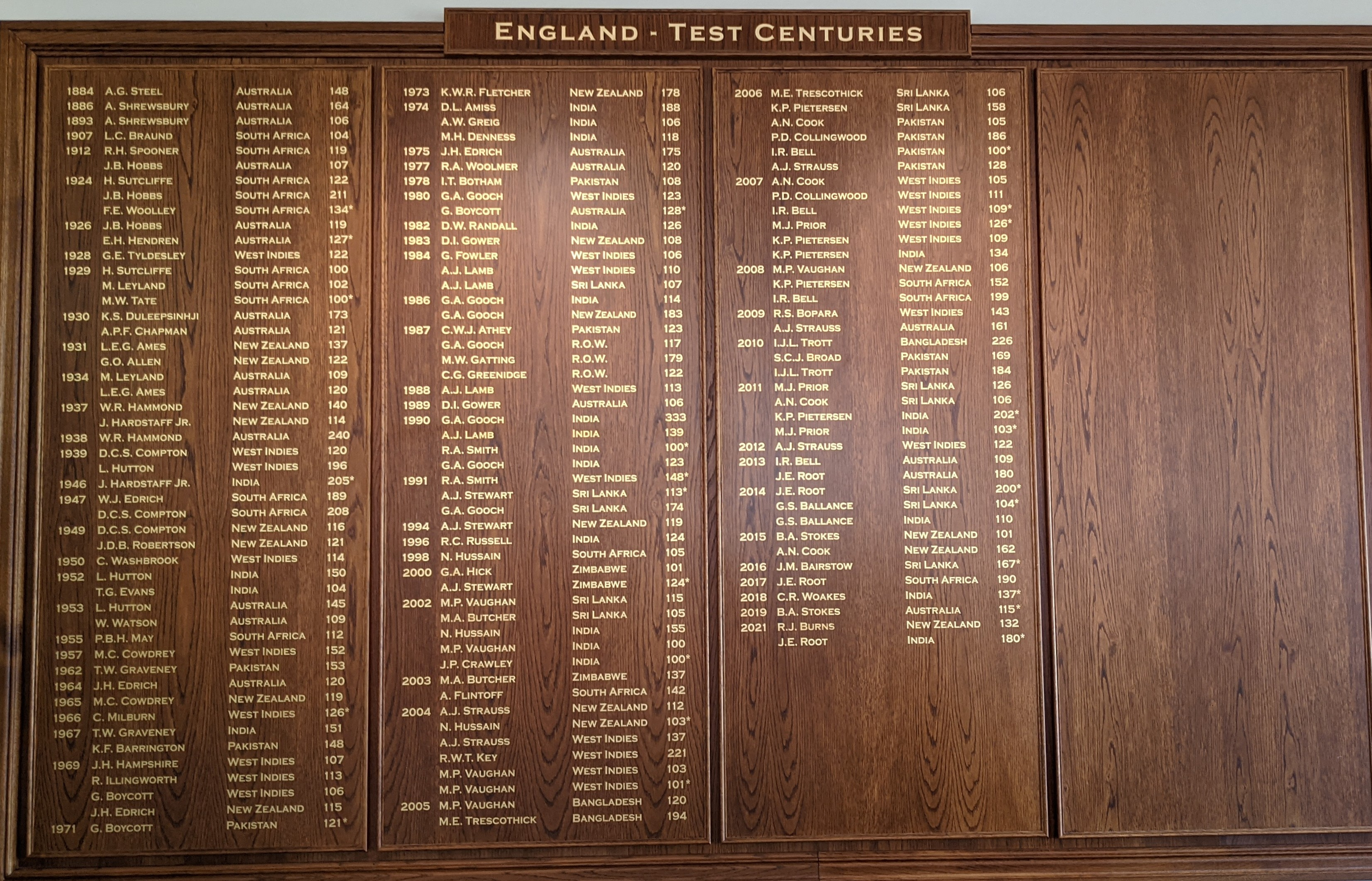
The Lord's honours board commemorating English centuries at Lord's

In cricket, a century is a score of 100 or more runs in a single innings by a batter. The term is also included in "century partnership" which occurs when two batsmen add 100 runs to the team total when they are batting together. A century is regarded as a landmark score for batters and a player's number of centuries is generally recorded in their career statistics. Scoring a century is loosely equivalent in merit to a bowler taking a five-wicket haul, and is commonly referred to as a ton or hundred. Scores of more than 200 runs are still statistically counted as a century, although these scores are referred to as double (200–299 runs), triple (300–399 runs), and quadruple centuries (400–499 runs), and so on. Reaching 50 runs in an innings is known as a half-century.

Scoring a century at Lord's cricket ground in London earns the batter a place on the Lord's honours boards, and many other grounds have their own honours boards.

== Earliest known centuries ==
Centuries were uncommon until the late 19th century because of the difficulties in batting on pitches that had only rudimentary preparation and were fully exposed to the elements. There is doubt about the earliest known century, but the most definite claim belongs to John Minshull, who scored 107 for the Duke of Dorset's XI v Wrotham at Sevenoaks Vine on 31 August 1769. This was a minor match.

The first definite century in a top-class match was scored by John Small when he made 136 for Hampshire v Surrey at Broadhalfpenny Down in July 1775. The earliest known century partnership was recorded in 1767 between two Hambledon batsmen, who added 192 for the first wicket against Caterham. It is believed they were Tom Sueter and Edward "Curry" Aburrow.

When Hambledon played Kent at Broadhalfpenny in August 1768, the Reading Mercury reported: "what is very remarkable, one Mr Small, of Petersfield, fetched above seven score notches off his own bat". It is not known if Small did this in one innings or if it was his match total. Hambledon batsmen Tom Sueter and George Leer are the first two players definitely known to have shared a century partnership when they made 128 for the first wicket against Surrey at Broadhalfpenny Down in September 1769.

== Highest number of centuries ==
=== First-class cricket ===
W. G. Grace was the first batsman to score 100 career centuries in first-class cricket, reaching the milestone in 1895. His career total of 124 centuries was subsequently passed by Jack Hobbs, whose total of 199 first-class centuries is the current record.

=== Test cricket ===
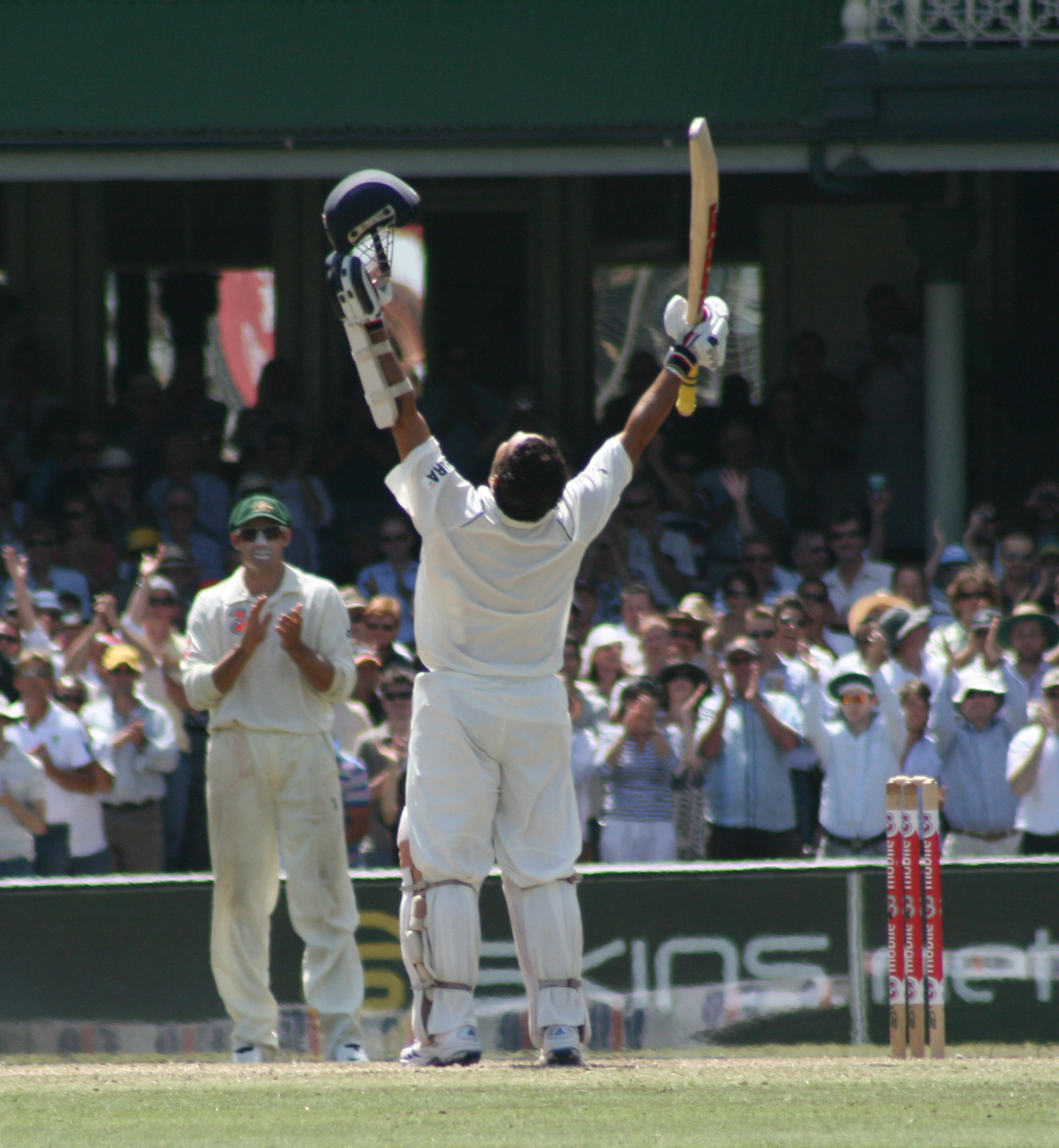
Tendulkar celebrates upon reaching his 38th Test century against Australia in the 2nd Test at the SCG in 2008, where he finished not out on 154.

The first century in Test cricket was scored by Charles Bannerman who scored 165 before retiring hurt, in the first ever Test between Australia and England, played at the Melbourne Cricket Ground from 15 to 19 March 1877. The first century partnership in Test cricket was between W. G. Grace and A. P. Lucas, batting for England, in the first innings of the only Test match between England and Australia on the Australians' 1880 tour of England, played at the Kennington Oval (6–8 September 1880).

The current holder of the record for most centuries in Test cricket is Sachin Tendulkar of India, who has scored 51 centuries.

=== One Day International cricket ===
The first One Day International (ODI) century was scored by Dennis Amiss, who made 103 for England against Australia at Old Trafford on 24 August 1972. It was nearly 25 years before the first ODI double century was scored by Australian Belinda Clark, who reached 229* against Denmark at the Middle Income Group Club Ground, Mumbai during the 1997 Women's Cricket World Cup. Currently, Virat Kohli holds the record by scoring 54 ODI centuries, followed by Sachin Tendulkar with 49 centuries, Rohit Sharma with 33 centuries and Ricky Ponting with 30 centuries.

=== Twenty20 International cricket ===
The first Twenty20 International (T20I) century was scored by Chris Gayle who amassed 117 runs against South Africa at Johannesburg in the first match of ICC World Twenty20 tournament in 2007. Rohit Sharma and Glenn Maxwell jointly hold the record for most T20I centuries (5).

== Fastest centuries ==
The fastest recorded century in Test cricket in terms of balls faced is held by Brendon McCullum, who scored 100 runs from 54 balls against Australia in 2016 at Christchurch, New Zealand, in his final test, beating the previous record of 56 held jointly by Viv Richards and Misbah-ul-Haq only to equal the record two balls later. The record for the fastest century in first-class cricket in terms of time taken, in genuine match conditions rather than in contrived circumstances with deliberately weak bowling, is held by Percy Fender, who scored 100 in 35 minutes for Surrey against Northamptonshire in a County Championship match in 1920. The record for the fastest recorded century in terms of balls faced in first-class cricket is held by David Hookes, who scored 102 runs from 34 balls for South Australia vs. Victoria in a Sheffield Shield match in 1982.

In One day International cricket (ODI), the fastest century is held by South African batsman AB de Villiers, whose century came up in just 31 balls against the West Indies in the 2nd ODI at Johannesburg on 18 January 2015, and included 8 fours and 16 sixes. Corey Anderson (New Zealand) is second, scoring a 36-ball century against West Indies in Queenstown on 1 January 2014. Shahid Afridi (Pakistan) is third, scoring a 37-ball century against Sri Lanka in Nairobi on 4 October 1996.

Sahil Chauhan of Estonia hit the fastest century in Twenty20 international cricket against Cyprus on 17 June 2024. Chauhan brought up his century in 27 balls, going past Jan Nicol Loftie-Eaton's hundred in 33 deliveries. Chauhan also broke Chris Gayle's record for the fastest century in Twenty20 cricket of 30 balls.

On 22 April 2019, Scottish cricketer George Munsey scored 100 in 25 balls playing for Gloucestershire 2nd XI; his 39-ball total of 147 included 20 sixes.

== See also ==
- List of cricketers by number of international centuries scored
- Nervous nineties
