= William Yalden =

Personal information
- Born: 1740; Chertsey, Surrey, England (Note: According to genealogical research by John Attfield, Yalden was probably baptised at Send near Woking in 1742. His burial records indicate that he was 80 when he was buried in January 1824.)
- Died: January 1824 (aged 83–84); Chertsey, Surrey, England
- Nickname: The Yold
- Batting: Right-handed
- Role: Wicket-keeper

Domestic team information
- Years: Team
- 1772–1773: Hampshire
- 1773–1779: Surrey
- 1773–1783: England
- 1776–1783: Kent
- 1775–1784: Chertsey

William Yalden (1740 – January 1824) was an English cricketer who played in the second half of the 18th century. He is one of the earliest known players to be classed as a wicket-keeper-batsman. Yalden played mainly for Chertsey and Surrey, although he was also a regular, sometimes as captain, for England (i.e., the "rest" of England). He also played as a given man for Hampshire and Kent, particularly in matches against Hampshire. His career began in the 1760s and he is known to have played until 1785.

== Cricket career ==
Between 1772 and 1783, Yalden made numerous appearances in important matches. (Note: Note that surviving match records to 1825 are incomplete and that match scorecards were not always created, have been lost, or were only partially completed.) He is known to have played in some minor matches, the last of which took place in 1785, and he is said to have been recruited to take part in an aborted 1789 visit to Paris to play against a French team.

While fielding records are incomplete during Yalden's career, he is credited with 64 catches and one stumping in important matches. His only known stumping was in a match between Surrey and Hampshire in October 1778, the victim being Henry Bonham. This is one of the earliest known stumpings and the first known to have taken place during an important match. (Note: Stumpings were not always recorded in scorecards of the time.) His best batting performance was also for Surrey against Hampshire. In September 1773 he scored 88 runs out of a total of 225, helping Surrey win by an innings and 60 runs. This innings set a new record for the highest individual score in important matches since reliable statistical records began in 1772. A right-handed batsman, he scored a total of 1,151 runs in important matches, including three half-centuries.

According to Arthur Haygarth, Yalden gave up cricket for one season because he thought his eyesight was failing, but he was persuaded to return to the game by the Earl of Tankerville; he resumed his career with continued success.

Described by John Nyren in The Cricketers of My Time as a "a thin, dark-looking man", (Note: An online version of Nyren's book edited by EV Lucas in 1907 can be found at Wikisource.) Yalden's reputation has divided opinion. Nyren, a contemporary of his, said he was "not a fine, but a very useful and steady batter" and that his wicket-keeping was inferior to that of Tom Sueter whom Nyren said had to keep wicket to quicker bowlers such as Thomas Brett. Nyren went on to suggest that Yalden's "word was not always to be depended on when he had put a man out" and that he might "trick" an umpire. In a 1998 edition of Nyren's book edited by Ashley Mote, Yalden's reputation was upheld, with Mote writing that "Yalden – the England wicketkeeper and captain, no less – is dismissed in a few words". (Note: Several other prominent cricketers are not mentioned at all in Nyren's book) Nyren is often accused of favouring players from his own Hambledon Club rather than their opponents, such as Yalden.

== Outside cricket ==
Yalden was a licensed victualler and the landlord of the Walnut Tree inn at Chertsey, (Note: The inn was later renamed The Cricketers. It stood at Chertsey Bridge.) although he also worked as a cobbler and shoemaker at various points. He was a member of the local cricket club and managed the nearby Laleham Burway ground. He was born either in Chertsey or nearby Ripley around 1740 and married Sarah Green in 1770. The couple had at least one child, a son named John, born in 1776. Yalden died at Chertsey and was buried there in January 1824.

== Bibliography ==
- Haygarth, Arthur (1862). Scores & Biographies, Volume 1 (1744–1826). Lillywhite.
- Lucas, E. V. (1907). The Hambledon Men. London: Henry Frowde. Available online at Wikisource.
- Nyren, John (1998). Ashley Mote (ed.). The Cricketers of my Time. London: Robson.
