= John Candler (cricketer) =

English cricketer

Personal information
- Born: 7 October 1873; Tendring, Essex
- Died: 4 December 1942 (aged 69); Finsbury, London
- Source: Cricinfo, 15 April 2017

John Candler (7 October 1873 – 4 December 1942) was an English cricketer. He played seven first-class matches for Cambridge University Cricket Club between 1894 and 1895.

Candler set an unwanted record by failing to score in his first nine first-class innings over six matches in 1894 and 1895. (Note: Candler’s record would be equalled by Tom Goddard in 1923, Seymour Clark in 1930, Brian Boshier in 1955, Ossie Wheatley in 1966 and Mike Selvey in 1972, before being beaten by Jim Griffiths in the middle 1970s and Mark Robinson in 1990.) He finally scored in his seventh and final first-class match, making 8 not out.

== See also ==
- List of Cambridge University Cricket Club players
