= Aburrow =

Aburrow is a surname of English origin. People with this surname include:

- Edward Aburrow Sr., English cricketer
- Edward "Curry" Aburrow (1747–1835), English cricketer
