= 1761 English cricket season =

Cricket season review

Some details have survived of four historically important eleven-a-side matches in the 1761 English cricket season, though none of their results are known. (Note: Any match listed in the ACS' Important Match Guide (1981) is historically important, and therefore of the highest standard, whether or not a scorecard might exist. The same applies to numerous matches discovered by researchers since 1981. For further information, see First-class cricket.) The famous Chertsey Cricket Club was active but overall there was again a scarcity of games, the main factor being the war situation.

== Matches ==
Only four significant matches are on record, but none of their results are known. Essex v Kent, on 27 June, was announced in the Ipswich Journal of the previous Saturday, 20 June, as: 11 men of Kent v. the best 11 of Essex. The precise venue was The Crown in Billericay.

On 1 July, Chertsey v Dartford at Laleham Burway was for 20 guineas a side. Chertsey had three given men: William Piper, Charles Sears, and Thomas Woods. The latter is interesting given the confusion over players called Wood or Woods in the 1770s; there was a Surrey player at that time who was variously called John Wood or Thomas Wood. The Whitehall Evening Post on Saturday 27 June said: Great sport is expected as they are accounted as good 22 men as any in England. Chertsey were then to play Richmond 31 August on Richmond Green. The stakes were £20 a side.

Crop of Christopher and John Greenwood's 8 inch-to-mile map published in 1827 from an 1830 republication (click to view all). The image shows Bunhill Fields immediately north of the Artillery Ground, with Chiswell Street to the south.

The last match on 28 September was Chertsey v Hampton on Laleham Burway. This was announced in the Whitehall Evening Post on Saturday, 26 September. Hampton had Charles Sears, John Haynes, and Shock White as given men. The enigmatic Shock White, who was a Brentford man, is not to be confused with Thomas White of Reigate.

== Other events ==
On Thursday, 2 July, the Whitehall Evening Post reported the death of Mr George Smith on Monday, 29 June at The Castle in Marlborough. He was formerly the keeper of the Artillery Ground, and the landlord of the adjoining Pyed Horse in Chiswell Street.

The Leeds Intelligencer (now the Yorkshire Post) announced a game to be played at Chapeltown on Thursday, 9 July. This is the earliest-known match in the Leeds area. Sheffield had been a centre of Yorkshire cricket since 1751.

The General Evening Post reported on Saturday, 18 July that part of the walls of Bunhill Fields Burial Ground and the Artillery Ground would shortly be taken down to widen that part of the City Road. See also 28 August in the 1776 season.

In its edition of Thursday, 3 September, the GEP announced an odds game in Essex with 22 of the county to play against the Dartford XI. This is the first known instance of 22 playing against 11, a common odds format in the 19th century, especially in matches between local teams and the All England Eleven. Dartford were to have Tom Faulkner and William Durling as given men.

== First mentions ==
=== Players ===
- William Piper (Chertsey)
- Charles Sears (Chertsey)
- Shock White (Brentford)

=== Venues ===
- The Crown, Billericay.
- Chapeltown Moor, Leeds

== Bibliography ==
- ACS (1981). A Guide to Important Cricket Matches Played in the British Isles 1709–1863. Nottingham: ACS. OCLC 85045528.
- Buckley, G. B. (1935). Fresh Light on 18th Century Cricket. Birmingham: Cotterell & Co. OCLC 23450280.
- Buckley, G. B. (1937). Fresh Light on pre-Victorian Cricket. Birmingham: Cotterell & Co. OCLC 23469107.
- Waghorn, H. T. (2005) [1906]. The Dawn of Cricket. London: J. W. McKenzie. ISBN 978-09-47821-17-3.
