= List of first-class cricket centuries by W. G. Grace =

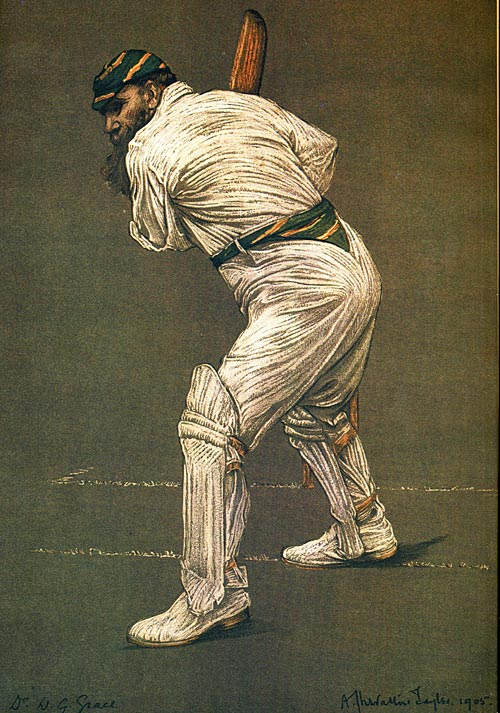
Painting of W. G. Grace batting for London County in 1905.

William Gilbert Grace, commonly known as W. G. Grace, is generally considered one of the greatest cricketers of all time. His first-class cricket career spanned 44 seasons, from 1865 until 1908, during which time he claimed over 2,800 wickets and over 800 catches. Despite this, he is best known for his batting ability: possessing a "high backlift and willingness to play off both front and back foot", he stood apart from other batsmen of the time. He scored over 50,000 first-class runs, a feat achieved by only six other cricketers, and was the first cricketer to score 100 or more centuries.

Disputes regarding the first-class status of a number of matches in which W. G. Grace played have resulted in him having varying career statistics published. Of his centuries, 124 were scored in matches universally accepted as being first-class, these are the figures which are published on both Cricinfo and CricketArchive. A number of further matches are considered to be first-class by some sources; in these matches he scored two centuries: for the "Gentlemen to Canada Touring Team" against the Marylebone Cricket Club in 1873, and for Gloucestershire against Somerset in 1879. Grace, in his 1899 reminiscences, records both of these centuries among his tally of first-class centuries. In Wisden Cricketers' Almanack's first-class records section, he is listed as having scored 126 centuries, the eleventh most hundreds scored during a career. He retains this position with the lower total of 124, also appearing eleventh on Cricinfo's list.

Grace made his first-class debut in June 1865 appearing for the Gentlemen of the South against the Players of the South at The Oval, but did not score his first century until his tenth match, making an unbeaten 224 for England against Surrey County Cricket Club at the same ground. In 1871, he reached 100 on 10 different occasions, the most during any season of his career. In doing so, he became the first batsman to pass 2,000 first-class runs in a season, tallying 2,739 in total. He scored the first triple century in first-class cricket in 1876, amassing 344 for the Gentlemen of Marylebone Cricket Club against Kent after the Gentlemen had been forced to follow on. Less than two weeks later, Grace passed 300 once more, scoring 318 not out for Gloucestershire against Yorkshire. He scored 177 in his only innings between the two triple-centuries, and scored 839 runs in eight days.

He scored his 100th century in 1895; at the time this was reckoned to be made in the county match between Gloucestershire and Somerset. Somerset's captain, Sammy Woods recollects the moment in his reminiscences:

During May we had a weird game at Bristol v. Gloucester. We scored 200 for 1 wicket. W. G. then went on and took 5 wickets, and we were all out for 300. He then proceeded to go in first and help himself to 288, and to get his hundredth century. I had the satisfaction of giving him a full pitch to get to his hundred, not that he wanted any help.

Grace comments in his memoirs that he was glad to make his hundredth century at Gloucestershire's ground. Excluding the two centuries not considered first-class by some modern statisticians, Grace's hundredth century came later in the same month when he scored 169 for Gloucestershire against Middlesex at Lord's. He scored his final first-class century in July 1904 for London County, reaching 166 against the Marylebone Cricket Club. He played first-class cricket for another four seasons, and scored 15 and 25 for the Gentlemen of England in his final outing, an innings defeat against Surrey.

== Key ==
- * denotes that he remained not out.
- Pos. denotes his position in the batting order.
- Inn. denotes the number of the innings in the match.
- Date denotes the date on which the match began.
- Drawn denotes that the match was drawn.
- Lost denotes that the match was lost by Grace's team.
- Won denotes that the match was won by Grace's team.
- ^{D} denotes that the century was scored in a match not universally considered first-class.
- ^{T} denotes that the century was scored in a Test match.

== Centuries ==
No.	Score	For	Against	Pos.	Inn.	Venue	Date	Result
1	224*	England	Surrey	5	1	The Oval, London	30 July 1866	Won
2	173*	Gentlemen of the South	Players of the South	5	2	The Oval, London	27 August 1866	Drawn
3	134*	Gentlemen	Players	3	1	Lord's, London	29 June 1868	Won
4	130	South of the Thames	North of the Thames	1	2	St Lawrence Ground, Canterbury	3 August 1868	Lost
5	102*	South of the Thames	North of the Thames	4	4	St Lawrence Ground, Canterbury	3 August 1868	Lost
6	117	Marylebone Cricket Club	Oxford University	2	2	Magdalen Ground, Oxford	13 May 1869	Won
7	138*	Marylebone Cricket Club	Surrey	1	1	The Oval, London	1 July 1869	Won
8	121	Marylebone Cricket Club	Nottinghamshire	1	4	Lord's, London	5 July 1869	Lost
9	180	Gentlemen of the South	Players of the South	2	2	The Oval, London	15 July 1869	Drawn
10	122	South	North	1	1	Bramall Lane, Sheffield	26 July 1869	Won
11	127	Marylebone Cricket Club	Kent	1	1	St Lawrence Ground, Canterbury	11 August 1869	Won
12	117*	Marylebone Cricket Club	Nottinghamshire	1	2	Lord's, London	13 June 1870	Lost
13	215	Gentlemen	Players	1	3	The Oval, London	14 July 1870	Drawn
14	109	Gentlemen	Players	1	1	Lord's, London	18 July 1870	Won
15	143	Gloucestershire	Surrey	1	1	The Oval, London	28 July 1870	Won
16	172	Gloucestershire	Marylebone Cricket Club	1	1	Lord's, London	1 August 1870	Won
17	181	Marylebone Cricket Club	Surrey	1	1	Lord's, London	15 May 1871	Won
18	118	Gentlemen of the South	Gentlemen of the North	1	2	Lillie Bridge, West Brompton	25 May 1871	Won
19	178	South	North	1	1	Lord's, London	29 May 1871	Won
20	162	Gentlemen of England	Cambridge University	1	1	Fenner's, Cambridge	1 June 1871	Won
21	189*	Single	Married	1	1	Lord's, London	10 June 1871	Won
22	146	Marylebone Cricket Club	Surrey	1	2	The Oval, London	20 July 1871	Lost
23	268	South	North	1	3	The Oval, London	31 July 1871	Drawn
24	117	Gentlemen of Marylebone Cricket Club	Kent	1	2	St Lawrence Ground, Canterbury	9 August 1871	Won
25	217	Gentlemen	Players	1	3	Royal Brunswick Ground, Hove	14 August 1871	Drawn
26	116	Gloucestershire	Nottinghamshire	5	3	Trent Bridge, Nottingham	21 August 1871	Lost
27	101	Marylebone Cricket Club	Yorkshire	1	1	Lord's, London	27 May 1872	Won
28	112	Gentlemen	Players	3	4	Lord's, London	1 July 1872	Won
29	117	Gentlemen	Players	1	1	The Oval, London	4 July 1872	Won
30	170*	England	Nottinghamshire and Yorkshire	1	1	Lord's, London	8 July 1872	Won
31	114	South	North	1	2	The Oval, London	25 July 1872	Won
32	150	Gloucestershire	Yorkshire	1	1	Bramall Lane, Sheffield	29 July 1872	Won
33	145	Gentlemen of the South	Players of the North	1	2	Prince's Cricket Ground, Chelsea	5 June 1873	Lost
34	134	Gentlemen of the South	Players of the South	1	1	The Oval, London	26 June 1873	Won
35	163	Gentlemen	Players	1	1	Lord's, London	30 June 1873	Won
36	158	Gentlemen	Players	1	1	The Oval, London	3 July 1873	Won
	152 ^{D}	Gentlemen to Canada Touring Team	Marylebone Cricket Club	1	1	Lord's, London	21 July 1873	Won
37	192*	South	North	1	1	The Oval, London	24 July 1873	Won
38	160*	Gloucestershire	Surrey	1	3	Clifton College Close Ground, Bristol	25 August 1873	Drawn
39	179	Gloucestershire	Sussex	1	1	County Ground, Hove	11 June 1874	Won
40	150	Gentlemen of the South	Players of the South	1	2	The Oval, London	25 June 1874	Won
41	104	Gentlemen of the South	Players of the North	1	2	Prince's Cricket Ground, Chelsea	20 July 1874	Won
42	110	Gentlemen	Players	1	3	Prince's Cricket Ground, Chelsea	23 July 1874	Won
43	167	Gloucestershire	Yorkshire	1	1	Bramall Lane, Sheffield	27 July 1874	Won
44	121	Kent and Gloucestershire	England	1	3	St Lawrence Ground, Canterbury	3 August 1874	Won
45	123	Gentlemen of Marylebone Cricket Club	Kent	1	2	St Lawrence Ground, Canterbury	5 August 1874	Won
46	127	Gloucestershire	Yorkshire	1	1	Clifton College Close Ground, Bristol	13 August 1874	Won
47	152	Gentlemen	Players	1	3	Lord's, London	5 July 1875	Won
48	111	Gloucestershire	Yorkshire	1	1	Bramall Lane, Sheffield	26 July 1875	Lost
49	119	Gloucestershire	Nottinghamshire	1	1	Clifton College Close Ground, Bristol	16 August 1875	Drawn
50	104	Gloucestershire	Sussex	1	3	County Ground, Hove	12 June 1876	Won
51	169	Gentlemen	Players	1	1	Lord's, London	3 July 1876	Won
52	114*	South	North	1	4	Trent Bridge, Nottingham	17 July 1876	Won
53	126	United South of England Eleven	United North of England Eleven	1	1	Argyle Street, Hull	3 August 1876	Drawn
54	344	Gentlemen of Marylebone Cricket Club	Kent	2	3	St Lawrence Ground, Canterbury	10 August 1876	Drawn
55	177	Gloucestershire	Nottinghamshire	1	1	Clifton College Close Ground, Bristol	14 August 1876	Won
56	318*	Gloucestershire	Yorkshire	1	1	College Ground, Cheltenham	17 August 1876	Drawn
57	261	South	North	1	1	Prince's Cricket Ground, Chelsea	31 May 1877	Won
58	110	Gloucestershire and Yorkshire	England	2	3	Lord's, London	16 July 1877	Drawn
59	116	Gloucestershire	Nottinghamshire	1	3	Trent Bridge, Nottingham	1 August 1878	Drawn
60	123	Gloucestershire	Surrey	1	3	The Oval, London	5 June 1879	Won
61	102	Gloucestershire	Nottinghamshire	1	2	Trent Bridge, Nottingham	31 July 1879	Drawn
	113 ^{D}	Gloucestershire	Somerset	1	1	Clifton College Close Ground, Bristol	11 August 1879	Won
62	106	Gloucestershire	Lancashire	7	2	Clifton College Close Ground, Bristol	26 August 1880	Won
63	152 ^{T}	England	Australia	2	1	The Oval, London	6 September 1880	Won
64	100	Gentlemen	Players	1	2	The Oval, London	30 June 1881	Won
65	182	Gloucestershire	Nottinghamshire	5	3	Trent Bridge, Nottingham	28 July 1881	Drawn
66	112	Gloucestershire	Lancashire	1	1	Clifton College Close Ground, Bristol	27 August 1883	Won
67	101	Marylebone Cricket Club	Australians	1	1	Lord's, London	22 May 1884	Won
68	107	Gentlemen of England	Australians	1	2	The Oval, London	26 June 1884	Lost
69	116*	Gloucestershire	Australians	4	1	Clifton College Close Ground, Bristol	7 August 1884	Lost
70	132	Gloucestershire	Yorkshire	1	1	Park Avenue, Bradford	27 July 1885	Drawn
71	104	Gloucestershire	Surrey	2	2	College Ground, Cheltenham	20 August 1885	Won
72	221*	Gloucestershire	Middlesex	1	1	Clifton College Close Ground, Bristol	24 August 1885	Won
73	174	Gentlemen	Players	1	1	North Marine Road Ground, Scarborough	3 September 1885	Won
74	148	Gentlemen of England	Australians	1	1	The Oval, London	17 June 1886	Drawn
75	104	Marylebone Cricket Club	Oxford University	1	2	University Parks, Oxford	21 June 1886	Won
76	110	Gloucestershire	Australians	4	3	Clifton College Close Ground, Bristol	5 August 1886	Drawn
77	170 ^{T}	England	Australia	1	1	The Oval, London	12 August 1886	Won
78	113	Gloucestershire	Middlesex	2	1	Lord's, London	2 June 1887	Drawn
79	116*	Marylebone Cricket Club	Cambridge University	1	4	Lord's, London	27 June 1887	Won
80	183*	Gloucestershire	Yorkshire	3	3	Spa Ground, Gloucester	30 June 1887	Drawn
81	113*	Gloucestershire	Nottinghamshire	1	3	Clifton College Close Ground, Bristol	8 August 1887	Lost
82	101	Gloucestershire	Kent	1	1	Clifton College Close Ground, Bristol	25 August 1887	Drawn
83	103*	Gloucestershire	Kent	1	3	Clifton College Close Ground, Bristol	25 August 1887	Drawn
84	215	Gloucestershire	Sussex	1	1	County Ground, Hove	21 May 1888	Drawn
85	165	Gentlemen of England	Australians	1	2	Lord's, London	28 May 1888	Drawn
86	148	Gloucestershire	Yorkshire	1	1	Clifton College Close Ground, Bristol	16 August 1888	Drawn
87	153	Gloucestershire	Yorkshire	1	3	Clifton College Close Ground, Bristol	16 August 1888	Drawn
88	101	Gloucestershire	Middlesex	1	3	Lord's, London	3 June 1889	Lost
89	127*	Gloucestershire	Middlesex	1	1	College Ground, Cheltenham	22 August 1889	Drawn
90	154	South	North	1	3	North Marine Road Ground, Scarborough	5 September 1889	Drawn
91	109*	Gloucestershire	Kent	1	1	Mote Park, Maidstone	22 May 1890	Lost
92	159*	Lord Sheffield's XI	Victoria	1	1	Melbourne Cricket Ground, Melbourne	27 November 1891	Won
93	128	Marylebone Cricket Club	Kent	1	1	Lord's, London	8 June 1893	Won
94	139	Marylebone Cricket Club	Cambridge University	1	2	Fenner's, Cambridge	24 May 1894	Won
95	196	Marylebone Cricket Club	Cambridge University	2	3	Lord's, London	25 June 1894	Won
96	131	Gentlemen	Players	1	2	Central Recreation Ground, Hastings	10 September 1894	Drawn
97	103	Marylebone Cricket Club	Sussex	1	3	Lord's, London	9 May 1895	Won
98	288	Gloucestershire	Somerset	1	2	Ashley Down Ground, Bristol	16 May 1895	Won
99	257	Gloucestershire	Kent	1	2	Bat and Ball Ground, Gravesend	23 May 1895	Won
100	169	Gloucestershire	Middlesex	1	1	Lord's, London	30 May 1895	Won
101	125	Marylebone Cricket Club	Kent	1	3	Lord's, London	13 June 1895	Won
102	101*	Gentlemen of England	I Zingari	1	4	Lord's, London	20 June 1895	Won
103	118	Gentlemen	Players	1	2	Lord's, London	8 July 1895	Lost
104	119	Gloucestershire	Nottinghamshire	1	1	College Ground, Cheltenham	19 August 1895	Won
105	104	South	North	2	3	Central Recreation Ground, Hastings	5 September 1895	Won
106	243*	Gloucestershire	Sussex	1	1	County Ground, Hove	25 May 1896	Drawn
107	102*	Gloucestershire	Lancashire	1	3	Ashley Down Ground, Bristol	25 June 1896	Lost
108	186	Gloucestershire	Somerset	1	1	County Ground, Taunton	29 June 1896	Won
109	301	Gloucestershire	Sussex	1	1	Ashley Down Ground, Bristol	3 August 1896	Won
110	113	Gloucestershire	Gentlemen of Philadelphia	1	1	Ashley Down Ground, Bristol	15 July 1897	Won
111	126	Gloucestershire	Nottinghamshire	3	2	Trent Bridge, Nottingham	22 July 1897	Won
112	116	Gloucestershire	Sussex	1	2	Ashley Down Ground, Bristol	2 August 1897	Drawn
113	131	Gloucestershire	Nottinghamshire	1	2	College Ground, Cheltenham	12 August 1897	Won
114	126	Gloucestershire	Essex	1	2	County Ground, Leyton	7 July 1898	Won
115	168	Gloucestershire	Nottinghamshire	1	1	Trent Bridge, Nottingham	21 July 1898	Drawn
116	109	Gloucestershire	Somerset	1	1	County Ground, Taunton	18 August 1898	Won
117	110*	London County	Worcestershire	1	3	Crystal Palace Park, London	13 August 1900	Won
118	110	London County	Marylebone Cricket Club	1	3	Crystal Palace Park, London	23 August 1900	Lost
119	126	South	North	1	1	Lord's, London	13 September 1900	Drawn
120	132	London County	Marylebone Cricket Club	1	1	Crystal Palace Park, London	8 August 1901	Drawn
121	131	London County	Marylebone Cricket Club	5	2	Crystal Palace Park, London	14 July 1902	Won
122	129	London County	Warwickshire	1	1	Crystal Palace Park, London	21 August 1902	Drawn
123	150	London County	Gloucestershire	4	2	Crystal Palace Park, London	4 June 1903	Won
124	166	London County	Marylebone Cricket Club	1	2	Crystal Palace Park, London	18 July 1904	Won
