= John Howarth (cricketer) =

English cricketer

Personal information
- Full name: John Stirling Howarth
- Born: 26 March 1945 (age 81); Stockport, Cheshire, England
- Batting: Right-handed
- Bowling: Right arm fast-medium
- Role: Bowler

Domestic team information
- Years: Team
- 1966–1970: Nottinghamshire
- 1977: Minor Counties East
- First-class debut: 6 August 1966 Nottinghamshire v Warwickshire
- Last First-class: 7 July 1967 Nottinghamshire v Indians
- List A debut: 13 May 1967 Nottinghamshire v Northamptonshire
- Last List A: 30 April 1977 Minor Counties East v Middlesex

Career statistics
| Competition | First-class | List A |
|---|---|---|
| Matches | 13 | 5 |
| Runs scored | 0 | 9 |
| Batting average | 0.00 | 4.50 |
| 100s/50s | 0/0 | 0/0 |
| Top score | 0* | 5 |
| Balls bowled | 1242 | 282 |
| Wickets | 19 | 8 |
| Bowling average | 33.78 | 18.12 |
| 5 wickets in innings | 0 | 0 |
| 10 wickets in match | 0 | n/a |
| Best bowling | 3/30 | 3/30 |
| Catches/stumpings | 3/– | 2/– |
- Source: CricketArchive, 30 September 2008

John Stirling Howarth (born 26 March 1945) is a former English county cricketer who played for Nottinghamshire County Cricket Club. A right-arm fast-medium bowler of some success, he is believed to hold the unfortunate record of most first-class matches played without scoring a run.

Howarth was born in Stockport, Cheshire and played for Notts in the 1966 and 1967 English cricket seasons. In 13 first-class games he took 19 wickets at an average just below 34. He is, however, best known for his remarkable record of scoring no runs in this time. A career of 13 first-class matches without a run is the world record. However, Howarth only batted seven innings in these matches (out of a theoretical maximum of 26, had he batted in two innings per game). In those he was dismissed four times for a duck, and finished not out without scoring on three other occasions, giving him a career best score of 0*. According to Lynch, the record for most innings in a career without scoring a run appears to belong to Seymour Clark, who played for Somerset County Cricket Club as a wicket-keeper in the 1930 season. In five matches he batted nine innings, with seven ducks and two scores of 0*.

Howarth, who also played for Minor Counties, had success in his one-day cricket career, although he was limited to 5 List A matches spread from 1967 to the 1977 season. He took 8 wickets at the low average of 18.12, with a strike rate of 35 balls per wicket and an economy rate of just 3.08 runs per over. His best bowling figures were 3/30, coincidentally identical to his first-class best. Howarth also had (slightly) more success with his right-handed batting, being dismissed only twice in four innings for a total of nine runs at an average of 4.50. His highest score was 5.
