= Cheden Holt =

Cricket venue in Hambledon, England

- Location: Hambledon, Hampshire
- Home club: Hambledon Club
- County club: Hampshire
- Establishment: by 1776
- Last used: 1776

Cheden Holt, situated on a hilltop about a mile from the rural village of Hambledon in Hampshire, was a home cricket venue of the Hambledon Club. It was used for a single important match in 1776, when Hampshire played England. England won by 5 wickets. There is no record of any other matches on Cheden Holt.

== Bibliography ==
- Haygarth, Arthur (1996) [1862]. Scores & Biographies, Volume 1 (1744–1826). Kennington: Frederick Lillywhite. ISBN 978-19-00592-23-9.
