= Robert Stone (cricketer) =

English cricketer (1749–1820)

Robert Stone (29 January 1749 – June 1820) was an English cricketer with amateur status. He was born in Brixton, and was initially associated with Surrey, but he went on to represent other teams.

== Career ==
The full span of Stone's career is uncertain, but he was definitely active between 1773 and 1780, playing in eight historically important matches. (Note: Any match listed in the ACS' Important Match Guide (1981) is historically important, and therefore of the highest standard, whether or not a scorecard might exist. The same applies to numerous matches discovered by researchers since 1981. For further information, see First-class cricket.)

According to CricketArchive, Stone resurrected his career with two further matches in the 1790 season, but it cannot be said with certainty that this was the same man, especially as he seems to have moved from Surrey to Kent. There is nothing in the main source, Scores & Biographies, to suggest a link and he is always listed in its scorecards as "Stone, Esq."

Stone's highest score of 35 was achieved in his first known appearance when he played for Surrey against Kent at Laleham Burway in 1773. CricketArchive credits him with 117 career runs, and 3 catches.

== Bibliography ==
- ACS (1981). A Guide to Important Cricket Matches Played in the British Isles 1709–1863. Nottingham: ACS. OCLC 85045528.
- Haygarth, Arthur (1996) [1862]. Scores & Biographies, Volume 1 (1744–1826). Kennington: Frederick Lillywhite. ISBN 978-19-00592-23-9.
