= Henry Bonham (cricketer) =

English cricketer and landowner (1749–1800)

Henry Bonham (1749–1800) was an English cricketer and landowner. He played one game for Hampshire when their matches were organised by the Hambledon Club.

== Biography ==
Bonham was born to John Bonham of Petersfield, Hampshire, one of a family of two boys and two girls; the Bonhams were a well-known and well-to-do Hampshire family. He bought the Buriton estate in 1798 from Lord Stawell, who had previously acquired it from the historian Edward Gibbon. He was appointed High Sheriff of Hampshire from 1794 to 1795.

Bonham was very fond of cricket and belonged to the Hambledon Club, the forerunner of Hampshire Cricket Club, where he was Steward six times and also Secretary. Bonham played one important match in 1778 as a gentleman amateur against Surrey.

On Bonham's death in 1800 he was buried at East Meon. Buriton passed to his brother Thomas who willed it on his own death to his cousin John Carter. Carter then changed his name to Bonham-Carter.

== External sources ==
- Henry Bonham at CricketArchive (subscription required)
