= Edward Aburrow Jr =

English cricketer (1747–1835)

Personal information
- Born: c.1747 Slindon, Sussex
- Died: 6 October 1835 (aged 87–88); Hambledon
- Nickname: Curry
- Batting: Right-handed
- Bowling: Underarm
- Role: Batter

Domestic team information
- Years: Team
- 1767–1782: Hampshire

Edward Aburrow Jr (c.1747 – 6 October 1835; aka "Curry") was an English cricketer who played for Hampshire when the team was organised by the Hambledon Club, in the second half of the 18th century. He is believed to have been an active player from about 1767 until 1782, and is known to have played in at least 45 matches. (Note: Any match listed in the ACS' Important Match Guide (1981) is historically important, and therefore of the highest standard, whether or not a scorecard might exist. The same applies to numerous matches discovered by researchers since 1981. For further information, see First-class cricket.) All his known appearances were for either Hambledon or Hampshire.

== Life and career ==
Aburrow Jr was born at Slindon in Sussex between 1747 and 1750, (Note: Some sources give a date of 1747 for Aburrow Jr's birth. Other sources, such as David Underdown, suggest 1750 as a more likely birth date.) and died at Hambledon, Hampshire on 6 October 1835. He was the son of the Slindon bowler Edward Aburrow Sr. Whereas his father was nicknamed "Cuddy", Aburrow Jr was known as "Curry", and that name was often recorded on scorecards.

According to one source, Aburrow Jr and Tom Sueter are believed to have taken part in cricket's earliest known century partnership. The partnership of 192 was described in a contemporary report as "the greatest thing ever known". However, contemporary sources do not actually name the two batters. The match in question was Caterham v Hambledon at Duppas Hill in September 1767. Hambledon won by 262 runs, which was a very large margin for the times.

According to John Nyren, Aburrow Jr was "a strong and well-made man, standing about five feet nine". One of Hambledon's "best long fields", Aburrow Jr was "a sure and strong thrower" who was highly mobile as a fielder. He was "a steady and safe batter", and also a "tolerably good change for bowling".

== Bibliography ==
- ACS (1981). A Guide to Important Cricket Matches Played in the British Isles 1709–1863. Nottingham: ACS. OCLC 85045528.
- Haygarth, Arthur (1996) [1862]. Scores & Biographies, Volume 1 (1744–1826). Kennington: Frederick Lillywhite. ISBN 978-19-00592-23-9.
- Mote, Ashley (1997). The Glory Days of Cricket. Robson. ISBN 978-1-8610-5111-0.
- Nyren, John (1998) [1832]. Mote, Ashley (ed.). The Cricketers of my Time. London: Robson Publishing. ISBN 978-18-61051-68-4.
- Underdown, David (2000). Start of Play. Westminster: Allen Lane. ISBN 978-07-13993-30-1 – via Internet Archive.
- Waghorn, H. T. (1899). Cricket Scores, Notes, &c. From 1730–1773. Edinburgh: Blackwood. OCLC 1086375331.
