= John Minshull =

English cricketer

John Minshull (c.1741 – 23 October 1793), also known as John Minchin, was a famous English cricketer during the 1770s. He scored the first definitely recorded century in cricket. He was born at Acton in Middlesex.

According to John Nyren, Minshull was a "capital hitter, and a sure guard of his wicket" but "not an elegant player, his position and general style were both awkward and uncouth". Minshull evidently had a high opinion of his own ability and was said to have been "as conceited as a wagtail and from his constantly aping what he had no pretensions to, was, on that account only, not estimated according to the price at which he had rated his own merits". Nyren added a physical description: "a thick-set man, about 5'9" in height, rather a slow mover in the field (and had) a tendency towards injury and illness".

Little is known about him personally except that he was for a time employed by the Duke of Dorset as a gardener at Knole House, near Sevenoaks. He played for Dorset's Kent during this period but it seems he then moved to Middlesex and then Surrey as he played for the Surrey eleven from 1775 till he was last recorded in 1780.

Minshull's century was scored on Thursday 31 August 1769 when he played for the Duke of Dorset's XI against Wrotham. It was a minor match but Minshull's score of 107 is the earliest definitely known century in any class of cricket. To reach his century Minshull scored 34 singles, 15 twos, 9 threes and 4 all run fours.

He was also the first batsman to be recorded dismissed 'hit wicket', while playing for All England against Hampshire at The Vine in 1773. Strangely he was probably not actually on strike at the time. Minshull died at Kingston upon Thames in Surrey aged 52 in 1793.
