= Seymour Clark =

English cricketer

Personal information
- Full name: Arthur Henry Seymour Clark
- Born: 26 March 1902; Weston-super-Mare, Somerset, England
- Died: 17 March 1995 (aged 92); Weston-super-Mare, Somerset, England
- Batting: Right-handed
- Role: Wicket-keeper

Domestic team information
- Years: Team
- 1930: Somerset
- First-class debut: 21 June 1930 Somerset v Derbyshire
- Last First-class: 5 July 1930 Somerset v Northamptonshire

Career statistics
Competition	First-class
Matches	5
Runs scored	0
Batting average	0.00
100s/50s	0/0
Top score	0*
Catches/stumpings	8/0
- Source: CricketArchive, 11 February 2015

Arthur Henry Seymour Clark (26 March 1902 – 17 March 1995), was a first-class cricketer who played five times for Somerset in the 1930 English cricket season and set a record for the number of innings batted without scoring a run that appears not to have been surpassed.

Clark, a locomotive driver with the Great Western Railway, did not play any cricket until he was 25, when he began playing for a railways team. Three years later he was called into the Somerset side for five matches when regular wicketkeeper Wally Luckes was ill. He took eight catches, and Wisden Cricketers' Almanack for 1931 said that he "rendered useful service in that capacity". He stood up to the wicket to all bowlers, even the fastest. The county offered him a professional contract but he decided to stay with the railway.

Clark is chiefly remembered as a batsman. In nine innings in the five games, he failed to score a single run. In the match against Northamptonshire at Kettering, he was not out in both innings and failed to score, but otherwise he was out for 0, bowled five times and caught twice. Nine innings is believed to be the record for a first-class cricketer who failed to score a single run. John Howarth of Nottinghamshire played in 13 matches without scoring, but batted only seven times.

In Clark's obituary in Wisden 1996 edition, it is reported that the Essex and England bowler Peter Smith, bowling Essex to an overwhelming victory at Colchester, attempted to give him a run. He bowled so gently to Clark that the ball bounced twice before reaching the batsman. Clark was still bowled by it. In club cricket, Clark reckoned his highest score was three.

Clark remained with the railway until he retired to Weston-super-Mare in 1965.
