= George Leer =

English cricketer

Virginia Spate
- Born: ca. 1748; Hambledon, Hampshire, England
- Died: 1 February 1812; Petersfield, Hampshire, England
- Occupations: Cricketer, singer and brewer

George Leer (1748 at Hambledon, Hampshire – 1 February 1812 at Petersfield, Hampshire) was an English cricketer who played for Hampshire in the time of the Hambledon Club.

Leer began playing in the 1760s. His name has become almost synonymous with the now archaic long stop fielding position (i.e., directly behind the wicket-keeper) that was deemed so necessary in underarm days.

According to Arthur Haygarth, Leer "was a good and successful bat, but was mostly famous as long-stop to Thomas Brett’s tremendous bowling in the Hambledon matches. He was always called "Little George", and was a fine singer, having a sweet counter-tenor voice. In John Nyren’s book, he is stated to have been a native of Hambledon, but latterly he was a brewer, residing at Petersfield, where he died".

George Leer was a small man who made 44 known appearances from the 1772 season to 1782.
