= Tom Sueter =

English cricketer

Personal information
- Full name: Thomas Sueter
- Born: 17 April 1750; Hambledon, Hampshire
- Died: 17 February 1827 (aged 76); Hambledon, Hampshire
- Batting: Left-handed
- Role: Wicket-keeper

Domestic team information
- Years: Team
- 1768–1786: Hampshire
- 1788–1789: Hampshire
- Source: CricketArchive, 3 April 2014

Thomas Sueter (17 April 1750 – 17 February 1827) was an English cricketer who represented Hampshire as a member of the Hambledon Club.

Sueter was a left-handed batsman and, with his contemporary William Yalden, one of the two most famous wicket-keepers of the 18th century. Sueter and Yalden are the earliest players to be recognised as wicketkeeper/batsmen, since they were specialist keepers who nevertheless justified selection for their batting alone. Sueter played mainly for Hampshire but in his closing seasons he represented Surrey, probably because of temporary residence in the county, though he evidently returned to Hambledon after he finished playing.

Sueter was a carpenter and builder by trade and Arthur Haygarth recorded that above the Hambledon church door in the 1860s was affixed a plaque saying: "Thomas Sueter and Richard Flood, builders, 1788".

Sueter began playing in the 1760s and made 67 known appearances from the 1772 season to the 1790 season. He is said "to have been the first (or one of the first) who departed from the custom of the old players, who deemed it a heresy to leave the crease for the ball; but he would get in at it, hit it straight off and straight on, and egad it went as if it had been fired." Sueter was also reckoned an excellent judge of a short run.

Like George Leer, Sueter was a fine singer and he belonged to the choir at his parish church. When he died, according to Haygarth, he left behind him a sovereign in order that an anthem should be sung in the church over his coffin; and this was done. Haygarth records that Sueter's tombstone was still standing in Hambledon churchyard in 1858 with the following inscription:

Sacred to the memory of THOMAS SUETER,
who departed this life the 17th day of February, 1827, aged 77 years
