= Thomas Brett (cricketer) =

English cricketer

Thomas Brett (1747 – 31 December 1809) was one of cricket's earliest well-known fast bowlers and a leading player for Hampshire when its team was organised by the Hambledon Club in the 1770s. Noted for his pace and his accuracy, Brett was a leading wicket-taker in the 1770s and was lauded by John Nyren in The Cricketers of my Time. Writing half a century later, Nyren described Brett as "beyond all comparison, the fastest as well as straitest bowler that ever was known".

== Career ==
Brett was born at Catherington in Hampshire. An unusual feature of his career, at a time when players were often given men, was that he always played for Hampshire. As he lived at Catherington, he was ineligible to represent Hambledon's Parish XI, and so played only for the county team.

Brett featured in the Monster Bat Incident 1771 as the bowler who led the protest and it is almost certain that he wrote out the formal objection to Thomas White's huge bat. This document, which has been preserved, was countersigned by his captain Richard Nyren and Hampshire's senior batsman John Small. The protest resulted in the maximum width of the bat being set at four and one quarter inches in the Laws of Cricket.

Brett is known to have made 38 appearances for Hampshire from 1769 to 1778. He is first recorded in the match against Caterham at Guildford Bason on Monday, 31 July 1769. His known career wicket tally was over 100, but the bowling details in every game are either unknown or incomplete. It is known, for example, that he took 29 wickets (all bowled) in just five matches in the 1777 season but, with catches, the true figure for wickets taken is almost certainly higher.

Brett's last recorded match was for Hampshire against Surrey at Laleham Burway in October 1778 when he was still only 31. It seems he went to live in Portsmouth so a change of occupation may have been the reason for his apparently early retirement. He died at Kingston Cross, Portsmouth.

== Sources ==
- Haygarth, Arthur (1862). Scores & Biographies, Volume 1 (1744–1826). Lillywhite.
- Nyren, John (1998) [First published 1833]. Ashley Mote (ed.). The Cricketers of my Time. London: Robson Books. ISBN 1-86105-168-9.
- Waghorn, H. T. (1906). The Dawn of Cricket. Electric Press.
- Wilson, Martin (2005). An Index to Waghorn. Bodyline.
