= Variations in published cricket statistics =

Cricket controversy

Variations in published cricket statistics have come about because there is no official view of the status of cricket matches played in Great Britain prior to 1895 or in the rest of the world prior to 1947. As a result, historians and statisticians have compiled differing lists of matches that they recognise as (unofficially) first-class. The problem is significant where it touches on some of the sport's first-class records, especially in regards to the playing career of W. G. Grace.

== Concept and definition of first-class cricket ==
The concept of a "first-class standard" was formalised in May 1894 at a meeting of the Marylebone Cricket Club (MCC) committee and the secretaries of the 14 clubs in the official County Championship, which had begun in 1890. As a result, these 14 clubs became officially first-class from 1895 along with MCC, Cambridge University, Oxford University, the main international touring teams and other teams designated as such by MCC (e.g., North v South, Gentlemen v Players, occasional XIs, etc).

First-class cricket was formally defined by the then Imperial Cricket Conference (ICC) in May 1947 as a match of three or more days' duration between two sides of eleven players officially adjudged first-class, with the governing body in each country to decide the status of teams. Significantly, it was stated that the definition does not have retrospective effect.

The absence of any ruling about matches played prior to 1947 (or prior to 1895 in Great Britain) has caused problems for cricket historians and especially statisticians. Matches that are believed to have met the official definitions, assuming they featured teams of the necessary high standard, have been recorded since 1697 (having been in vogue since the 1660s).

It was inevitable that historians and statisticians would seek to apply unofficial first-class status retrospectively, despite the ICC and MCC's directives. The position is that each writer must compile their own list based on personal opinion: as a result, significant differences may be observed in published statistical records, with particular impact on the career records of W. G. Grace, Jack Hobbs and Herbert Sutcliffe. There are also differences in the perceived status of certain matches played by Gloucestershire teams before the county club was formed in 1870, and by Somerset in 1879 and 1881.

One of the problems here is that statisticians have tended not to publish their match lists with their findings: it should, however, be noted that the number of differences is extremely small in terms of the sport's overall statistics.

== Development of scoring to 1895 ==
The problem of different versions is as old as cricket scorecards themselves. The earliest known scorecards are dated 1744 but very few were created (or have survived) between 1744 and 1772 when they became habitual.

The main source for scorecards from 1772 until the 1860s is Arthur Haygarth’s Scores & Biographies, which was published in several volumes. Haygarth used a number of sources for his scorecards including many that were created by the Hambledon Club and MCC. He frequently refers to earlier compilers such as Samuel Britcher, W. Epps and Henry Bentley. Haygarth often mentions in his match summaries that another version exists of the scorecard he has reproduced. Sometimes he outlines the differences which range from players' names to runs scored and even to apparent discrepancies in innings totals or match results.

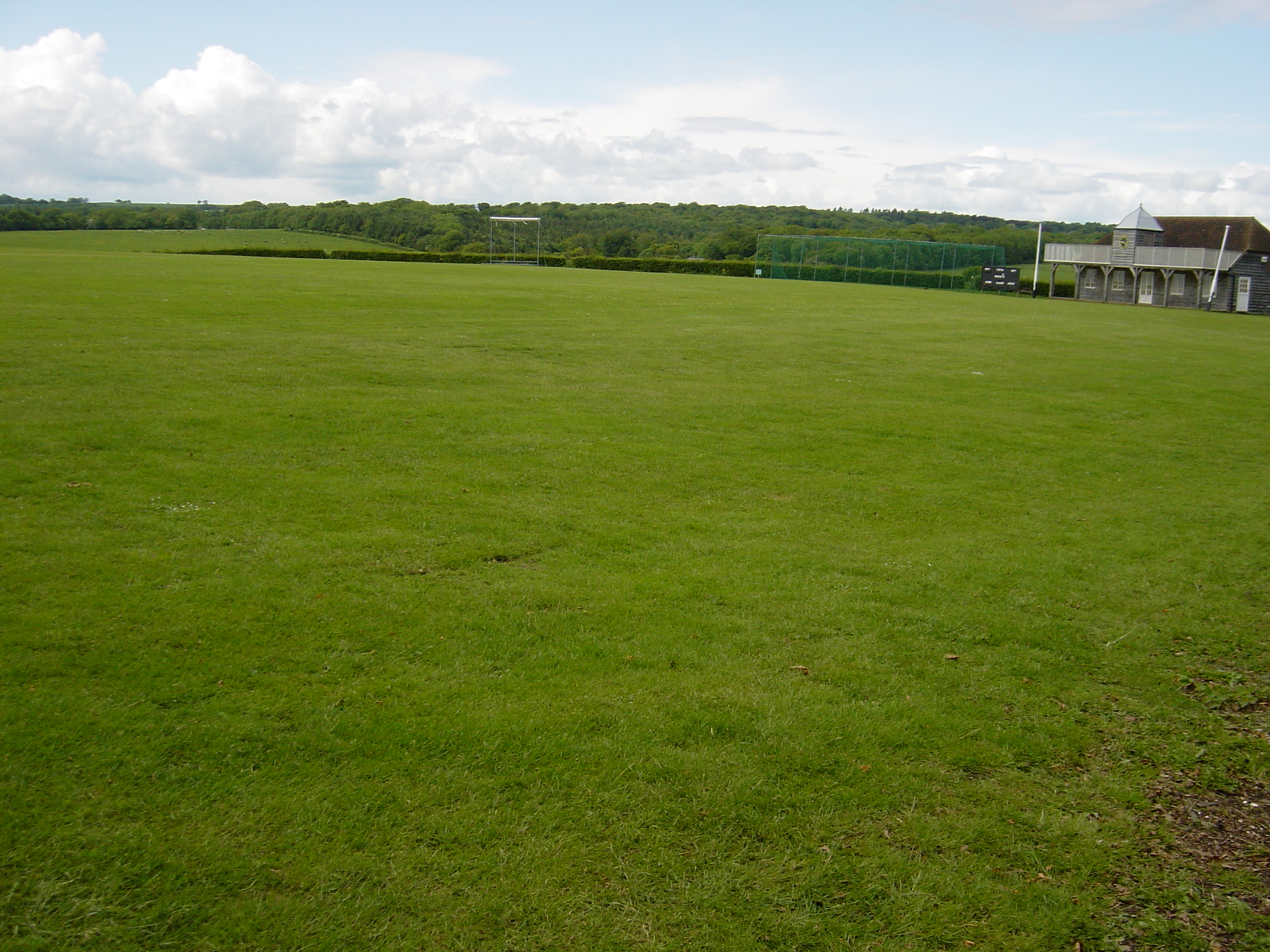
Broadhalfpenny Down, one of the venues at which the earliest known scorecards were compiled

Haygarth first mentions the difficulty of obtaining scorecards in his summary of the Hampshire v Surrey match at Broadhalfpenny Down on 26 August 1773:

"The Score of this match was obtained from the Hampshire Chronicle, and it was not inserted in the old printed book of Hambledon Scores from 1772 to 1784".

Then, in his summary of the Surrey v Hampshire match at Laleham Burway on 6–8 July 1775:

"The above is taken from the old printed score books; but in another account, in the first innings of Surrey, Miller is b Brett...&c".

He goes on to list a total of 13 differences between his two versions, some re dismissal details and others re scores. He then makes a highly pertinent comment:

"It may here be remarked, that when there are two scores of the same match, they never agree" (the italics are Haygarth's own).

In saying that, Haygarth has recognised the essence of the problem when there is no standard means of scoring and no centralised control over the system of capturing and storing the data. Scoring systems in the 18th century and most of the 19th century had nothing like the consistency of standard that was employed through the 20th century to the present. Many early cards gave no details of dismissal. Where dismissal was recorded, it was limited to the primary mode and so a fielder would be credited with a catch but the bowler would not be credited with the wicket unless he bowled out the batsman. MCC finally responded to the problem in 1836 when they decided to include in their own scorecards (i.e., for matches played at Lord's) the addition of bowlers' names when the dismissal was caught, stumped, lbw or hit wicket. Haygarth comments that "this was a vast improvement in recording the game and but justice to the bowler". As a result, scorecards became more detailed through the second half of the 19th century but reliability remained a problem and different versions continued to appear. It was some time before the MCC scorecard standard was adopted throughout the country and the inclusion of bowling analyses "was not introduced until several years afterwards".

A greater problem surfaced after 1890 with the establishment of the County Championship because, as described above, this gave rise in 1895 to the concept of first-class cricket and so, for the first time, there was a perceived higher standard based on organisation of games in an official competition. Until then, everything had been somewhat ad hoc and "playing standards" was a term applied very liberally, especially with teams containing guest or occasional players in addition to recognised players.

== Commencement of statistical records ==
=== England ===
The earliest mainstream publication of cricket statistics was done by members of the Lillywhite family. Frederick Lillywhite, son of William Lillywhite, first published his Guide to Cricketers in 1848. In 1865, his brother John published his Cricketer's Companion (known as "Green Lilly" on account of its cover). Two years later the two were amalgamated with the Companion "incorporating" the Guide. In 1872, their cousin James Lillywhite junior started his Cricketers' Annual (known as "Red Lilly"). A further period of competition ensued until another amalgamation in 1880 created John and James Lillywhite's Cricketer's Companion, still incorporating the Guide. This survived until 1883 when James announced he was "now sole proprietor". After 1885, the Companion was incorporated with the Annual, which continued until 1900.

In 1864, John Wisden introduced his Wisden Cricketers' Almanack which, after an uncertain start, went on to become "the cricketers' Bible". Meanwhile, Arthur Haygarth published his Scores and Biographies for Frederick Lillywhite from 1862 to 1871, but these were not statistical as such, rather a record of known scorecards.

The concept of a first-class level of cricket seems to have taken hold in the 1860s, perhaps through the influence of the Guide to Cricketers, and W. G. Grace certainly considered his matches in 1864 to have been "first-class". Nevertheless, Grace's "first-class career" was effectively defined after his death when F. S. Ashley-Cooper compiled a season-by-season record to supplement Grace's obituary in the 1916 edition of Wisden. This record became Grace's "traditional figures" and, as described later, was the statistical basis for the celebrations in 1925 when Jack Hobbs passed the total of 126 career centuries that Ashley-Cooper had attributed to Grace.

Playfair Cricket Annual began in 1947, but followed Wisden in statistical terms. In 1951, Roy Webber published his Playfair Book of Cricket Records and, in his introduction, expressed the view that "first-class records should commence in 1864". A number of sources have agreed with this date. Webber then commenced a review of 19th century matches and later published his version of Grace's career record, declaring that Ashley-Cooper had allocated first-class status to a number of minor matches.

Bill Frindall published The Kaye Book of Cricket Records in 1968, and subsequently several editions of his Wisden Book of Cricket Records: as he explained in the preface to one of the Wisden editions, he favoured 1815 as the starting point for "proper" first-class cricket, though he conceded that there is a reasonable case for several other years, particularly Webber's 1864. Frindall thus included the entire roundarm era, but also a substantial part of the underarm era. Wisden Cricketers' Almanack, for which Frindall was the chief statistician, also commences its first-class records section in 1815.

The Association of Cricket Statisticians and Historians (ACS) was founded in 1973, with Rowland Bowen among the first to raise doubts in its journal that there could ever be a generally acknowledged list of first-class matches. In 1976, the ACS produced a booklet, A Guide to First-class Cricket Matches played in the British Isles (with a second edition in 1982), outlining its view of the first-class matches played from 1864 to 1946. This was followed by booklets covering other countries and, in 1981, A Guide to Important Cricket Matches played in the British Isles 1709–1863.

From 1996, the ACS produced a further series of booklets giving complete scorecards of matches from 1801 that it now considered first-class. The ACS gave in its journal a number of reasons for taking its startpoint back from 1864 to 1801, among them an agreement with Frindall's view that the standard of play during the roundarm era were as high as those in the overarm era. The ACS disagreed with Frindall about 1815 because it wanted to include the full set of Gentlemen v Players fixtures that began in 1806. It chose 1801 as a date of convenience, and thereby set up a division between the 18th and 19th centuries, which was contested by several people (including many ACS members) who recognised 1772 as the startpoint given the availability of data in surviving scorecards from that season. In its spring 2006 journal, the ACS admitted that it could not decide upon its position vis-à-vis 18th century records because of "missing or incomplete scorecards". But it is by no means certain that there is a complete statistical record of matches between 1801 and 1825 either, especially given the loss of records in the catastrophic Lord's fire. Certainly, there are no complete bowling figures in that period, or until 1836, and the surviving scorecards are similar in standard and content to 18th century scorecards.

In 2005, scorecards and other details of all known matches prior to 1801 were loaded into the CricketArchive database and there classified as "major" or "minor" pending an overall accord with other sources about first-class status. CricketArchive’s "major" classification effectively stated a view that the matches concerned were first-class providing they were not single wicket, the other form of top-class cricket that was popular in the 18th century. In early 2010, CricketArchive reorganised its classification of first-class matches to commence with the 1772 season. The handful of earlier scorecards, including the two in 1744, are arguably too isolated for inclusion: in this sense, the "statistical record" is divorced from the "historical record" which includes all significant matches, dating from 1697, for which no scorecard has survived. Contrary to Bowen's view, there is now a general accord, apart from a few matters of detail, in terms of statistical first-class status.

The issue with using any cut-off date as a startpoint is that it excludes everything before that date, despite cricket's history making clear that there has been a continuous standard of top-class cricket in England since the late 17th century. It is true that none of the cricketers with large career totals played before 1864 (Webber's main reason for adopting that date), and so his startpoint was not really an issue in that context. It does, however, exclude numerous leading players and it impacts other cricket records: if first-class cricket did not begin until 1864, then legendary cricketers like Richard Newland, John Small, William Beldham, Alfred Mynn and William Caffyn were not first-class players. Among records, the lowest known team score occurred in the 1810 match between England and The Bs (with Wells and Lawrell), when The Bs were dismissed for 6 in their second innings; that match is not regarded as first-class by those statisticians who still use 1815 or 1864 as their statistical startpoint. The real significance of 1864 was the legalisation of overarm bowling, but there is also evidence of a more structured approach to inter-county cricket which ultimately brought about the introduction of the official County Championship. 1864 was also the first year in which Wisden Cricketers' Almanack was published: while this is seen as the key source for cricket records, there are plenty of earlier sources.

The fire at Lord's occurred on the night of 28 July 1825, when the pavilion burned down and many invaluable and irreplaceable records were lost. It is believed that these included unique scorecards of early matches. The main difficulty encountered by researchers is the absence of match details from before the Lord's fire, and there are numerous matches in the 18th century which are known about in name only, with no scores having survived.

=== Other countries ===
CricketArchive is clear about the first-class cricket startpoints in other countries, and these seem to be agreed by other sources:

- Australia – February 1851.
- New Zealand – January 1864.
- West Indies – February 1865.
- North America – October 1878.
- South Africa – March 1889 (also the country's first Test match).
- India – August 1892.

First-class cricket in the other Test nations began much later.

== W. G. Grace's career statistics ==
=== Centuries ===
W. G. Grace began his senior career in 1865 and continued through a record-equalling 44 seasons to 1908. There is general agreement about the status of his matches after the 1895 watershed, but a measure of disagreement about the status of some of his earlier matches. Grace's "original" career totals were compiled by Ashley-Cooper and added to his obituary in the 1916 Wisden.

The first statistician to make a significant challenge to these "accepted figures" was Roy Webber, who published the Playfair Book of Cricket Records in 1951. This deferred to the Wisden version re Grace. During the 1950s, Webber made a detailed study of Grace's career and in the February 1961 edition of Playfair Cricket Monthly, he presented his own revised figures by excluding matches he did not regard as first-class.

In his later record books (e.g., The Book of Cricket Records, concise edition, 1963), Webber quoted both versions, referring to the Wisden totals as the "accepted figures" and his own as the "corrected figures", but excluded Grace's 1873 "double" to indicate that he preferred the "corrected figures".

The same approach was used by Bill Frindall in his Kaye Book of Cricket Records published in 1968. Webber's "corrected figures" were based on a slightly different matchlist to that subsequently created by the Association of Cricket Statisticians (ACS) in the 1970s: the differences here are that Webber included the Gloucestershire match of 1868, but excluded two England v XIII of Kent matches played in 1878 and 1879 and all five Gloucestershire v Somerset matches between 1882 and 1885 (see below).

The main issues arising from the disagreement about W. G. Grace’s career totals are as follows:

- Firstly, did Grace score 124 or 126 first-class centuries in his career?
- Secondly, when did Grace score his hundredth first-class century?
- Thirdly, when did Jack Hobbs break Grace's world record total of first-class centuries?

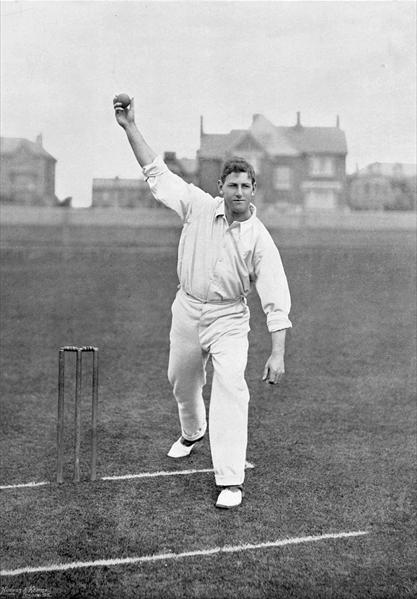
Sammy Woods bowled the delivery that gave W. G. Grace his one hundredth first-class century

At 1pm on 17 May 1895, in the Gloucestershire v Somerset match at County Cricket Ground, Bristol, Sammy Woods bowled a slow full toss, perhaps deliberately, which W. G. Grace dispatched to the boundary. Woods walked down the pitch and shook hands with the great man who had just completed his hundredth hundred, a century of centuries. It was an occasion for celebration: poems were written, commemorative plates were produced, Grace’s health was widely toasted. WG went on to make 126 career centuries.

At the time, it was widely if not universally accepted that Grace's list of centuries included a score of 152 in 1873 for the Gentlemen to Canada Touring Team v XV of MCC, and a score of 113 in 1879 for Gloucestershire v Somerset. Later statisticians have challenged the status of these two matches, and have proposed that Grace in fact completed his hundredth first-class century for Gloucestershire v Middlesex at Lord's on 30 May 1895 when he scored 169. Thus, according to their statistics, WG's career total was 124 centuries.

On the morning of 17 August 1925, a Somerset v Surrey match was taking place at County Ground, Taunton. Jack Hobbs, 92 not out overnight, turned Jimmy Bridges to leg and completed his 126th first-class century to equal Grace's career record. Percy Fender brought out a wine glass for Hobbs to enjoy a celebratory drink (as he was a teetotaler, it is reputed that the glass contained only ginger ale). As Hobbs had been near to his century the previous evening, the press were present in large numbers. They departed with their stories and on the next day Somerset recovered from a first innings deficit of 192 to leave Surrey needing 183 to win. Andy Sandham, Hobbs' opening partner, was in no hurry: Hobbs reached his 127th century with the winning runs to break Grace's record and give Surrey victory by 10 wickets. Such was the unexpected nature of Somerset's recovery that only a small crowd was there to celebrate.

If W. G. Grace's alternative figures are applied, then Hobbs broke Grace's world record (i.e., his 125th century) on 20 July 1925, when he scored 105 for Surrey v Kent at Blackheath. Hobbs still holds the world record as of 2022, and went on to make 197 or 199 career centuries (see details below).

=== Grace's career batting figures ===
The table below summarises W. G. Grace's career figures with his original totals, as calculated by Wisden Cricketers' Almanack, and his alternative totals, that now appear on CricketArchive:

	career	I	NO	Runs	Avge	HS	100
'original'	1865–1908	1,493	105	54,896	39.55	344	126
'alternative'	1865–1908	1,478	104	54,211	39.45	344	124

The "extra" 15 innings took place over 10 matches, listed below with his scores in each innings:

- 1868 MCC v Gloucestershire at Lord's – 24, 13
- 1872 Hertfordshire v MCC at Chorley Wood – 0, 75
- 1872 South v North at The Oval – 1
- 1873 Hertfordshire v MCC at Chorley Wood – 47, 26
- 1873 MCC v Staffordshire at Lord's – 67
- 1873 XV of MCC v Gentlemen to Canada Touring Team at Lord's – 152, 5
- 1873 South v North at The Oval – 37*
- 1879 Gloucestershire v Somerset at Clifton College – 113
- 1881 Somerset v Gloucestershire at Lansdown CC, Bath – 80
- 1881 Gloucestershire v Somerset at Cheltenham College – 15, 30

==== 1916 Wisden totals ====
Grace's "original" totals were compiled by Ashley-Cooper and added to his obituary in the 1916 Wisden.

The only comment there on which matches were regarded as first-class is given on page 96:

The above figures, which have been checked most carefully throughout, will be found to differ in several instances from those given in the cricket publications of the sixties and seventies; but, considering that the handbooks of that period frequently contradicted each other, and that the averages given in one seldom, if ever, agreed with those tabulated in another, that is not surprising.

Ashley-Cooper compiled Grace's batting averages to the end of the 1896 season, and these were published in a series of articles in Cricket: A Weekly Record of the Game in late 1896 and early 1897. In the first article, Ashley-Cooper says:

I have included MCC v Herts and MCC v Staffordshire, which, although not really first-class, have always been reckoned in WG's averages for 1873.

Between this 1896 article and the 1916 obituary, Ashley-Cooper omits three matches played by Grace for the South Wales Cricket Club during its tour of the London area in the latter half of July 1865:

- Middlesex Club & Ground v South Wales
- I Zingari v South Wales
- Surrey Club & Ground v South Wales

Furthermore, Ashley-Cooper includes the Oxford University v Gentlemen of England match at Oxford in May 1866 which he had previously omitted.

This demonstrates that even after 1896, the career figures were sufficiently uncertain that he revised the list of first-class matches. It would have been difficult for Ashley-Cooper to include and exclude matches in which Grace scored a century, but clearly the career run total was sufficiently uncertain that matches in which he did not score a century could be added or removed without much comment.

One aspect of Ashley-Cooper's analysis that must be questioned is his assertion that the performances of Grace in a certain match should be regarded as first-class but that performances by other players should not. Clearly, if a match is first-class, then all players taking part must have the match included in their own first-class records.

Incidentally, the 1896 Wisden includes Grace's career figures to the end of the 1895 season: this also gives the same number of centuries as the 1916 edition, but his season totals differ in some respects.

==== 1868 match ====
Gloucestershire matches are generally regarded as first-class from 1870 onwards. The 1869 edition of John Lillywhite's Cricketer's Companion (aka "Green Lilly") does not include the 1868 MCC v Gloucestershire match in Grace's first-class figures, but Ashley-Cooper retrospectively chose to add it to his totals for the season.

==== 1873 matches ====
The 1873 games typify the loose manner in which statistics were compiled in those days. Grace's first-class batting aggregate for that season included his scores in the MCC matches against Hertfordshire and Staffordshire, and in the North v. South game at The Oval on 26 July. On the other hand, his bowling in the same matches was ignored.

The match on 26 July was in fact a one-day filler that was played because the scheduled three-day North v. South match had finished a day early on 25 July: it is questionable if fillers have ever been regarded as major or first-class matches.

Grace's 1873 first-class aggregate was originally published in the 1874 edition of "Green Lilly" which includes the matches quoted in Grace's batting totals, but not in his bowling totals. In the 1916 obituary in Wisden, Ashley-Cooper chose to add the wickets to Grace's bowling total rather than remove the runs from his batting total.

The inclusion of those wickets increased Grace's 1873 season bowling total to over 100 wickets, meaning Ashley-Cooper had thereby manufactured the first-ever instance of a player performing the double. In all Wisdens between 1875 and 1916, the records section has the first-ever double being performed by Grace in 1874.

Then, having included the three 1873 matches, Ashley-Cooper did the same for two similar matches in the 1872 season: Hertfordshire v MCC and another North v. South filler on 27 July. This is difficult to justify, since these matches were not included in Grace's first-class totals that appear in the 1873 edition of "Green Lilly".

Another dubious match in 1873 is the one between an amateur team made up of those who had toured Canada and the USA in August and September 1872 and an XV of the MCC. Odds matches are not usually regarded as first-class, but there are exceptions, including two England v XIII of Kent matches played in 1878 and 1879, in which Grace took part. However, in the 1872 match, not only did the MCC team have 15 batsmen, they also had 15 players in the field.

"Green Lilly" says: Before the publication of the names of the respective sides there was every prospect of a match at once worthy of the Transatlantic celebrity of Mr Fitzgerald's team and the match-making sagacity of the Club Committee, but when the lists came out, not a few intending spectators of the contest made up their minds for a disappointment. There really did not appear on the side of the fifteen 'metal' enough to encourage the hope of a good fight.

==== Status of Somerset matches ====
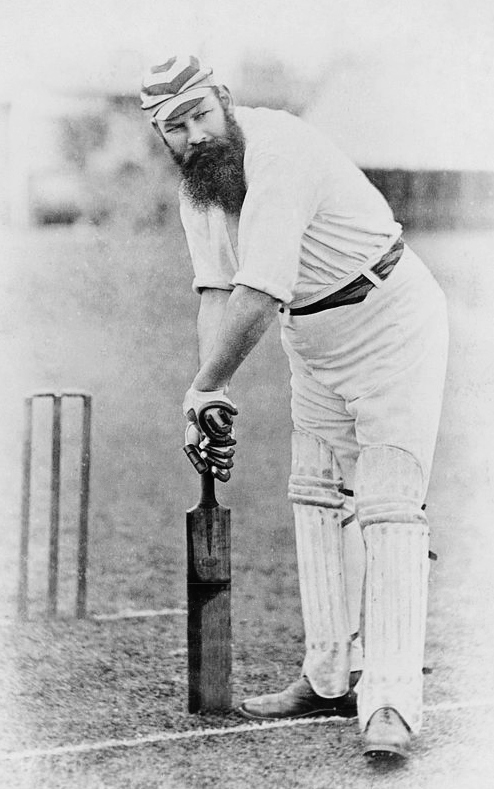
W. G. Grace takes guard in 1883, the year of two disputed matches for Gloucestershire v Somerset

The remaining area of uncertainty relates to the status of Somerset. Grace played a number of matches for Gloucestershire against Somerset between 1879 and 1885.

The 1879 and 1881 matches were not included in the first-class averages in "Green Lilly" or James Lillywhite's Cricketers' Annual (aka "Red Lilly").

In Wisden 1882, the editor states: As it is, the untiring energy of the executive will be rewarded by seeing Somersetshire (sic) classed with the first-class counties in the coming season. This statement clearly indicates that Wisden did not regard Somerset as first-class in 1881. For the 1882 season, both "Green Lilly" and "Red Lilly" include Grace's performance against Somerset in his first-class figures and Wisden remarks that "Somersetshire's debut among the first-class counties was disappointing".

Grace's scores against Somerset in 1883 are included in his first-class totals in "Green Lilly" and "Red Lilly", and similarly his scores in 1885 are included in "Red Lilly" first-class totals, "Green Lilly" having ceased publication by that time. Cricket: A Weekly Record of the Game differs from the annuals and excludes Somerset from its first-class averages for the seasons 1882 to 1885. The Somerset games that involved Grace from 1882 to 1885 were:

- 1882 Gloucestershire v Somerset at Spa Ground, Gloucester
- 1883 Gloucestershire v Somerset at Clifton College
- 1883 Somerset v Gloucestershire at Taunton
- 1885 Gloucestershire v Somerset at Moreton-in-Marsh
- 1885 Somerset v Gloucestershire at Taunton

CricketArchive has Somerset as first-class between 1882 and 1885 but not before then. Thus, Ashley-Cooper chose to retrospectively classify the 1879 and 1881 Somerset matches as first-class, while Wisden has continued to include these matches in Grace's totals despite the editor's statement in the 1882 edition.

It is worth noting that until publication of the ACS lists in the 1970s, Somerset's own publications had treated the club as first-class dating from its entry into the County Championship in 1891. Since the ACS published its lists, Somerset's publications have included the matches between 1882 and 1885 as first-class but not those prior to 1882.

=== Grace's career bowling figures ===
Although not so controversial, there are also different versions of Grace's career bowling figures. In the 1916 Wisden obituary, his figures are 51,545 runs conceded, 2864 wickets + 12 wickets taken in innings where the runs conceded is not known, resulting in an average of 17.99. For some unknown reason, the modern publications using these totals have added the wickets totals together (i.e. 2876) and give a resulting average of 17.92. The 2006 Playfair Cricket Annual is particularly confusing in this regard, as for Alfred Shaw the wicket total is given as 2026+1, indicating the 1 wicket where the runs conceded is not known.

The Cricket Archive totals are 50,980 runs conceded and 2809 wickets taken for an average of 18.15. Many of the differences are because of the exclusion of the 10 matches listed above, in which he took 67 wickets (including all 12 of the wickets taken in innings where the runs conceded are not known). There are, however, a number of instances where the bowling figures differ from those used by Ashley-Cooper. Three of these result in changes to the number of wickets taken:

- 1874 Sussex v Gloucestershire at County Cricket Ground, Hove 1st innings – Hall b G. F. Grace; not W. G. Grace
- 1876 Nottinghamshire v Gloucestershire at Trent Bridge 2nd innings – Padley c E. M. Grace b W. G. Grace; not c E. M. Grace b G. F. Grace
- 1878 Gloucestershire v Lancashire at Clifton College 1st innings – Kershaw c E. M. Grace b W. G. Grace; not c E. M. Grace b G. F. Grace

== Jack Hobbs ==
The situation with Jack Hobbs is simpler than with Grace and relates to a match for The Reef v MCC during the tour of South Africa in 1909–10; and the tour of India and Ceylon by the Maharajkumar of Vizianagram's team in 1930-31. He did not score a century in the 1909–10 match but scored two in the 1930-31 tour.

Given that he was near the end of his career in 1930-31, his centuries total is subject to variation from this time only, when he had already scored over 170 centuries. Therefore, the date of his 100th century is uncontested, while the date on which he passed Grace's record of centuries is only affected by the differing viewpoints regarding Grace’s own centuries total (that is, 124 or 126).

The table below summarises Jack Hobbs' career figures with his original totals, as calculated by Wisden, and his alternative totals, that now appear on CricketArchive:

	career	I	NO	Runs	Avge	HS	100
'original'	1905–1934	1315	106	61237	50.65	316*	197
'alternative'	1905–1934	1325	107	61760	50.70	316*	199

=== The Reef v MCC 1909–10 ===
Playfair and Wisden figures include this match. CricketArchive does not. Hobbs scored 39 and 31.

Wisden 1931 (part 1, page 329) states:

I have also to acknowledge receipt of a letter from Mr. H.E. Holmes of Durban, enclosing the text of a pronouncement made by the South African Board of Control to the effect that, in the opinion of that body, the contest between the MCC team and The Reef at Vogelfontein on 22 and 23 December 1909, was not a first-class match. In the course of this encounter Hobbs scored 70 runs which are counted in his first-class aggregate. Seeing that the game was regarded, at the time it was played, as first-class and until a little while ago had been left in undisputed possession of that rank, the need for raising any question about the matter after more than twenty years is not at all obvious. In any circumstances, I should not advise the dragging up of what, with all due respect to the recent ruling of the South African Board, must remain a debatable matter. The Reef team included some Test match players and others who had appeared in Inter-State games so it certainly had considerable claims to be regarded as first-class and from that standing, I cannot, all things considered, agree after such a long lapse of time to reduce it. Outside the merits of the case, is there not something rather grotesque in the idea of a controlling body sitting in solemn conclave over so small a matter and deciding to upset what had been accepted for twenty years?

Wisden therefore decided to ignore the ruling and has continued to recognise this match as first-class. Playfair also recognises the match, but other sources including CricketArchive have accepted the SABC ruling and do not recognise it. It is possible that the SABC thought it was a two-day match, but Wisden 1911 clearly states that "not a ball could be bowled on the first and fourth days": thus, it was actually planned as a four-day match.

=== 1930–31 tour of India and Ceylon ===
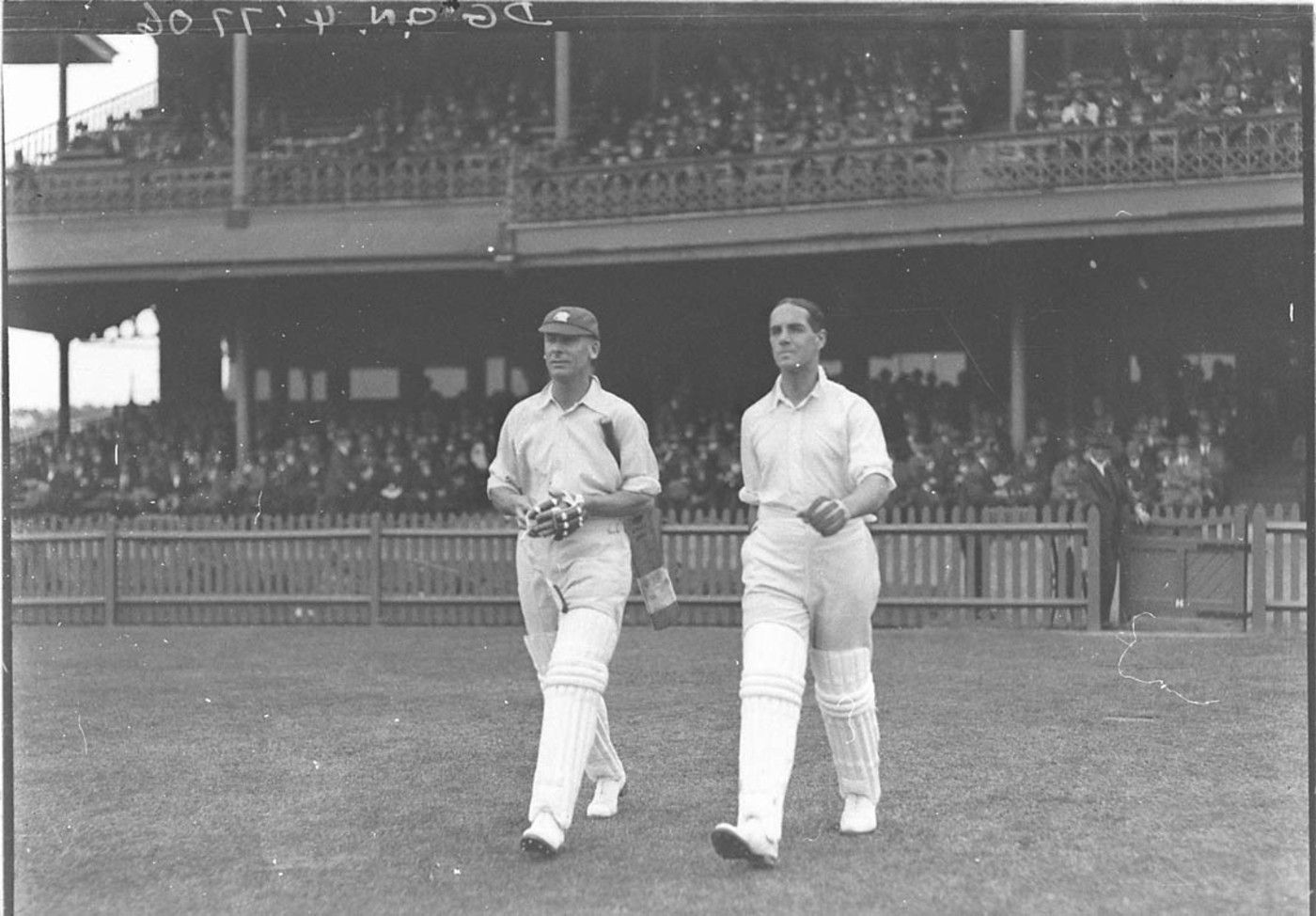
Jack Hobbs (left) walks out to bat at the Sydney Cricket Ground with his opening partner Herbert Sutcliffe. Their career statistics are dependent on the status of matches they played in India in 1930-31.

Playfair and Wisden figures exclude this tour. CricketArchive includes it. Hobbs played in 9 matches with 12 innings, 1 not out, 593 runs, 2 centuries. See below re Herbert Sutcliffe.

An MCC tour of India was planned for 1930-31, but it was cancelled due to civil unrest. The Maharajkumar of Vizianagram (aka Vizzy) determined to organise his own tour which included many of India's principal players. In addition, Jack Hobbs and Herbert Sutcliffe were engaged. The matches were not reported in Wisden and are not included in its career totals for either Hobbs or Sutcliffe. At the time, Wisden rarely reported on Indian cricket except for the Bombay Tournament. Vizzy's team also toured Ceylon and played three three-day matches that were similarly disregarded by Wisden. They were however prominently featured in The Cricketer Spring Annual for 1932. In these matches, Jack Hobbs scored two centuries in Ceylon, while Herbert Sutcliffe scored one century in India and one in Ceylon.

Hobbs himself did not consider these matches to be first-class: "'Don't include those,' he told the late John Arlott. 'They were exhibition matches. Vizzy wanted to list our hundreds on the walls of his pavilion. We knew we'd got to score hundreds - so did the bowling side. They were not first-class in any sense.'"

== Other cricketers ==
Although the variations in career totals are most significant in the cases of Grace and Hobbs, there are differences for many other players too. Clearly the inclusion or exclusion of matches noted above affects the totals of all cricketers playing in these matches and there are other matches where there is disagreement regarding their first-class status. As described above, the sport's early scorecards often show differences in match details which lead to different totals. This is more common with bowling and fielding figures.

A detailed comparison of differences between various publications was produced by Philip Bailey in 1987.

=== Batting ===
Of those who scored 35,000 first-class runs the following are affected.

==== Liverpool and District v Yorkshire 1892 ====
This is ranked as first-class by some sources, as are other Liverpool v Yorkshire matches between 1887 and 1894, but this particular match was not reported by contemporary publications. Playfair and Wisden figures exclude this match. CricketArchive includes it.

- George Hirst – 4, 29*

==== Surrey v Essex at Leyton 1896 ====
Wisden 1897 and CricketArchive have different scorecard data. In the Surrey second innings, Wisden has Bobby Abel 4 and Tom Hayward 8 while CricketArchive has Abel 8 and Hayward 4.

==== The Reef v MCC 1909–10 ====
Playfair and Wisden figures include this match. CricketArchive does not. See above re Jack Hobbs.

- David Denton – 17, 22
- Frank Woolley – 3, 7*
- Wilfred Rhodes – 24, 56*

==== 1922–23 Indian domestic season ====
Playfair and Wisden figures exclude these matches. CricketArchive includes them.

- Wilfred Rhodes – 4 matches, 8 innings, 1 not out, 247 runs

==== 1930–31 tour of India and Ceylon ====
Playfair and Wisden figures exclude this tour. CricketArchive includes it. See above re Jack Hobbs.

- Herbert Sutcliffe – 7 matches, 10 innings, 1 not out, 532 runs, 2 centuries

=== Bowling ===
Of those who have taken 2,000 first-class wickets, the following are affected (this is limited to differences in the games played or wickets taken).

==== Liverpool and District v Yorkshire 1892 ====
See above. Playfair and Wisden figures exclude this match. CricketArchive includes it.

- George Hirst – 1/40, 2/50

==== The Reef v MCC 1909–10 ====
Playfair and Wisden figures include this match. CricketArchive does not.

- Colin Blythe – 3/37
- Frank Woolley – 2/8
- Wilfred Rhodes – did not bowl

==== 1917–18 Indian domestic season ====
Playfair and Wisden figures include Bengal Governor's XI v Maharaja of Cooch-Behar's XI. CricketArchive does not.

- George Dennett – 4/69
- Jack Newman – 5/22, 3/32

==== 1918–19 Indian domestic season] ====
Playfair and Wisden figures include Bengal Governor's XI v Maharaja of Cooch-Behar's XI and MC Bird's XI v Maharaja of Cooch-Behar's XI. CricketArchive does not.

- Jack Newman – 5/94 (first match); 5/104, 4/34 (second match)

==== 1922–23 Indian domestic season ====
See above. Playfair and Wisden figures exclude these matches. CricketArchive includes them.

- Wilfred Rhodes – 4 matches, 329 runs, 17 wickets

==== Other differences ====
- Ewart Astill has 2,431 wickets in Wisden and 2,432 in CricketArchive
- Jack White has 2,356 wickets in Wisden and 2,355 in CricketArchive

White's difference is sourced to Somerset v Surrey at Recreation Ground (Bath) in 1920. In the second innings, Wisden has Bill Hitch b White while CricketArchive has him b Jimmy Bridges.

== International cricket ==
Test cricket officially began in March 1877, but the term was applied retrospectively to the early matches, and there have also been instances of retrospective recognition since.

A key point is that Test cricket is a form of first-class cricket, but is a different form of competition within the concept to, say, the County Championship or the Ranji Trophy. Although several international matches had taken place before 1890, it was not until then that the term "Test cricket" was coined by the Australian cricket chronicler Clarence Moody when compiling a list of matches in his Australian Cricket and Cricketers. Moody's list gained approval in Australia, and was then accepted by the leading English authority, C. W. Alcock, who quoted it in Cricket.

Retrospective Test status has been granted to the West Indies v England series in 1929–30 and the 1945–46 match at Basin Reserve, Wellington between New Zealand and Australia. The 1929–30 West Indies tour is of particular importance, as it was at Kingston, Jamaica on 3 April 1930 that Andy Sandham scored 325: this is considered the first Test score of 300 or more, breaking the record of 287 set by R. E. Foster in 1903. Sandham's record was itself broken in England by Don Bradman at Headingley three months later; at the time, it was Bradman who was considered to have broken Foster's record.

== Bibliography ==
- Altham, H. S. (1962). A History of Cricket, Volume 1 (to 1914). George Allen & Unwin.
- ACS (1982). A Guide to First-class Cricket Matches Played in the British Isles. ACS.
- ACS. The Cricket Statistician (various editions). ACS.
- Bill Frindall, The Kaye Book of Cricket Records, Kaye & Ward, 1968
- Bill Frindall, Wisden Book of Cricket Records, Wisden, 1998 (4th edition)
- Arthur Haygarth, Scores & Biographies, several volumes, Lillywhite, 1862 to 1871
- James Lillywhite's Cricketers' Annual (Red Lilly), Lillywhite, 1872 to 1900 (reviews of seasons 1871 to 1899)
- John Lillywhite's Cricketer's Companion (Green Lilly), Lillywhite, 1865 to 1885 (reviews of seasons 1864 to 1884)
- Rae, Simon (1998). W. G. Grace: A Life. Faber & Faber. ISBN 978-0-571-17855-1.
- Roy Webber, The Playfair Book of Cricket Records, Playfair Books, 1951
- Roy Webber, The Book of Cricket Records, Playfair Books, 1963 (concise edition)
- Wisden Cricketers' Almanack, 27th edition, editor Charles F. Pardon, John Wisden & Co., 1890
- Wisden Cricketers' Almanack, 32nd edition, editor Sydney Pardon, John Wisden & Co., 1895
- Wisden Cricketers' Almanack, 85th edition, editor Hubert Preston, Sporting Handbooks Ltd, 1948
