= First-class cricket =

Cricket played at the highest domestic standard

First-class cricket, along with List A cricket and Twenty20 cricket, is one of the highest-standard forms of cricket. A first-class match is of three or more days scheduled duration between two teams of eleven players each, and is officially adjudged to be worthy of the status by virtue of the standard of the competing teams. Matches must allow for the teams to play two innings each, although in practice a team might play only one innings or none if the match is abandoned.

The etymology of "first-class cricket" is unknown, but the term was used loosely before it acquired official status in 1895, following a meeting of leading English clubs. At a meeting in 1947 of the International Cricket Council, then known as the Imperial Cricket Conference (ICC), first-class was formally defined on a global basis. A significant omission of the ICC ruling was any attempt to define first-class cricket retrospectively. That left statisticians with the problem of how to categorise earlier matches for their statistical purposes, especially those played in Great Britain before 1895. In 1981, The Association of Cricket Statisticians and Historians (ACS) published a list of early matches which have historic importance, and are believed to have been top-class. In the 2020s, however, both the ACS and Wisden Cricketers' Almanack shifted their positions by adopting 1772 as the start point for first-class statistics, but this does not undermine the historical importance of earlier matches.

Test cricket, the highest standard of cricket, is statistically a form of first-class cricket, though the term "first-class" is mainly used to refer to domestic competition. A player's first-class statistics include performances in Test matches as well.

== Before 1895 ==
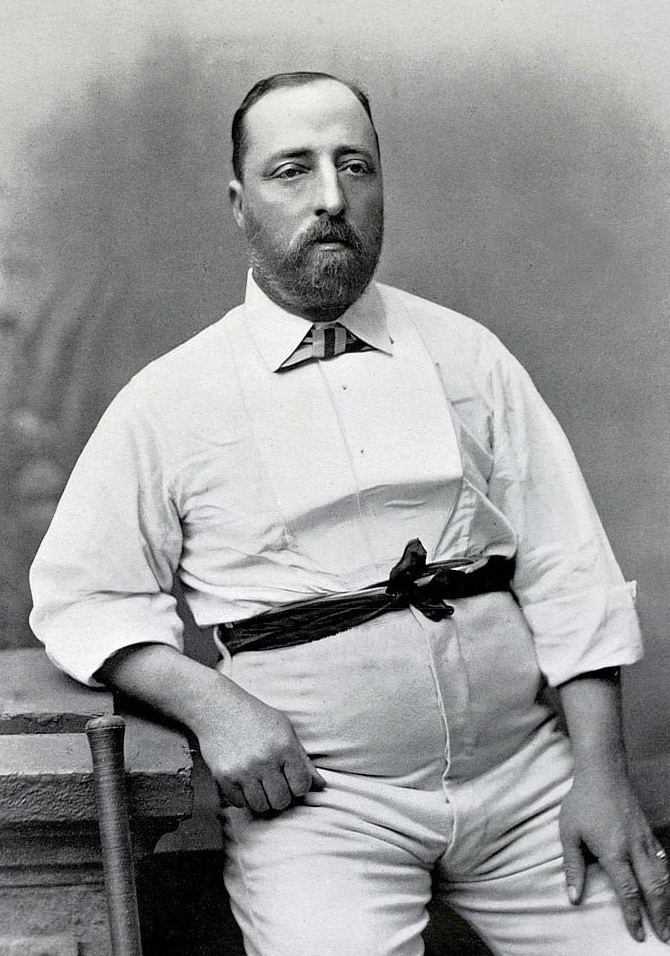
Alfred Shaw led the England team on the 1881–82 tour.

Before 1895, "first-class" was a common adjective applied to cricket matches in England, used loosely to suggest that a match had a high standard; adjectives like "great", "important" and "major" were also loosely applied to such matches, but there tended to be differences of opinion. According to Wisden Cricketers' Almanack (Wisden): "the term 'first-class' did not become established until about 1880". In the inaugural issue of Cricket: A Weekly Record of the Game on 10 May 1882, the term is used twice on page 2 in reference to the recently completed tour of Australia and New Zealand by Alfred Shaw's XI. The report says it is "taking" the first-class matches to be one against Sydney [sic]; two each against Victoria, the Combined team, and the Australian Eleven; and another against South Australia. In the fourth issue on 1 June 1882, James Lillywhite refers to first-class matches on the tour, but gives a different list.

The earliest known match scorecards date from 1744 but only a few have been found before 1772. The cards for three 1772 matches have survived, and scorecards became increasingly common thereafter. At the beginning of the 1860s, there were only four formally constituted county clubs. Sussex was the oldest, formed in 1839, and it had been followed by Kent, Nottinghamshire, and Surrey. In the early 1860s, several more county clubs were founded, and questions began to be raised in the sporting press about which should be categorised as first-class, but there was considerable disagreement in the answers. In 1880, the Cricket Reporting Agency was founded. It acquired influence through the decade, especially by association with Wisden, and the press came to generally rely on its information and opinions.

== Initial usage under MCC ruling, May 1895 ==
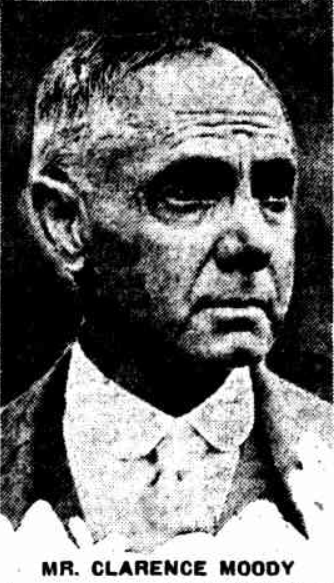
Clarence P. Moody

The term acquired official status, though limited to matches in Great Britain, following a meeting at Lord's in May 1894 between the Marylebone Cricket Club (MCC) committee, and the secretaries of the clubs involved in the official County Championship, which had begun in 1890. As a result, those clubs became first-class from May 1895 along with MCC, Cambridge University, Oxford University, senior touring teams (i.e., Australia and South Africa at that time), and other teams designated as such by MCC (e.g., North v South, Gentlemen v Players, and occasional "elevens" which consisted of recognised first-class players). Officially, therefore, the inaugural first-class match was the opening game of the 1895 season between MCC and Nottinghamshire at Lord's on 1 and 2 May, which ended with MCC winning by 37 runs.

"Test match" was another loosely applied term at the time, and the first list of matches considered to be "Tests" was conceived and published by South Australian journalist Clarence P. Moody in his 1894 book, Australian Cricket and Cricketers, 1856 to 1893–94. His proposal was widely accepted after a list of 39 matches was reproduced in the 28 December 1894 issue of Cricket: A Weekly Record of the Game. The list began with the Australia v England match at the Melbourne Cricket Ground on 15–17 March 1877. It ended with a recent match between the same two teams, played 14–20 December 1894 at the Association Ground, Sydney. All of Moody's matches, plus four additional ones, were retrospectively recognised as Test matches and also, thereby, as first-class matches.

== Formal definition under ICC ruling, May 1947 ==
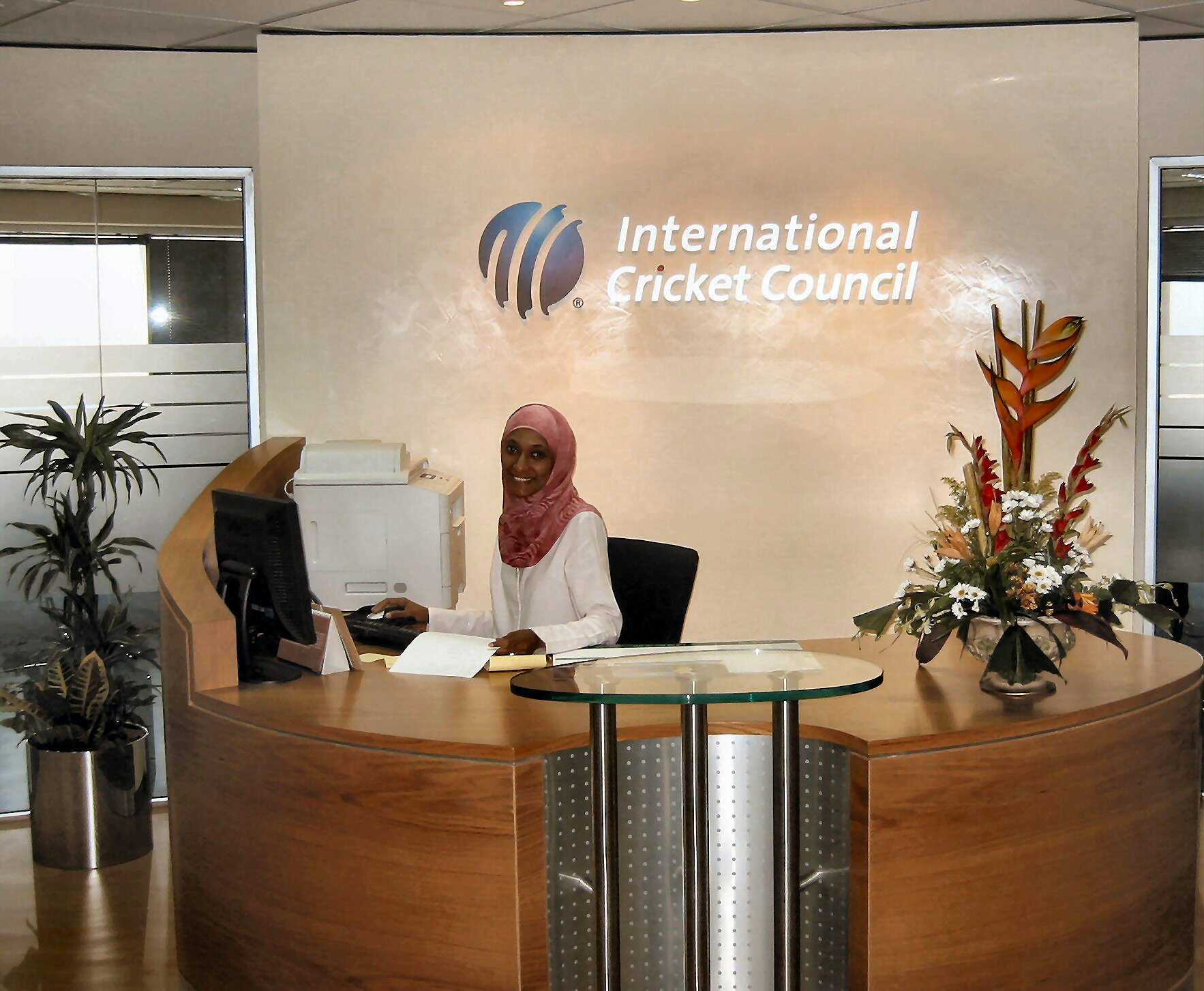
ICC headquarters in Dubai

The term "first-class cricket" was formally defined by the International Cricket Council then known as the Imperial Cricket Conference (ICC) on 19 May 1947. It was made clear that the definition "will not have retrospective effect". In November 2021, however, the ICC retrospectively applied first-class status to women's cricket, aligning it with the men's game. Furthermore, the ICC have ruled that any known breach of the rules governing use of substitutes may result in the match retrospectively losing its first-class status.

The 1947 definition is as follows:

A match of three or more days' duration between two teams of eleven players officially adjudged first-class, shall be regarded as a first-class fixture. Matches in which either team have more than eleven players or which are scheduled for less than three days shall not be regarded as first-class. The Governing body in each country shall decide the status of teams.

MCC was authorised to determine the status of matches played in Great Britain. To all intents and purposes, the 1947 ICC definition confirmed the 1894 MCC definition, and gave it international recognition and usage. Hence, official judgment of status is the responsibility of the governing body in each country that is a full member of the ICC. The governing body grants first-class status to international teams and to domestic teams that are representative of the country's highest playing standard.

== Classification of Official Cricket ==
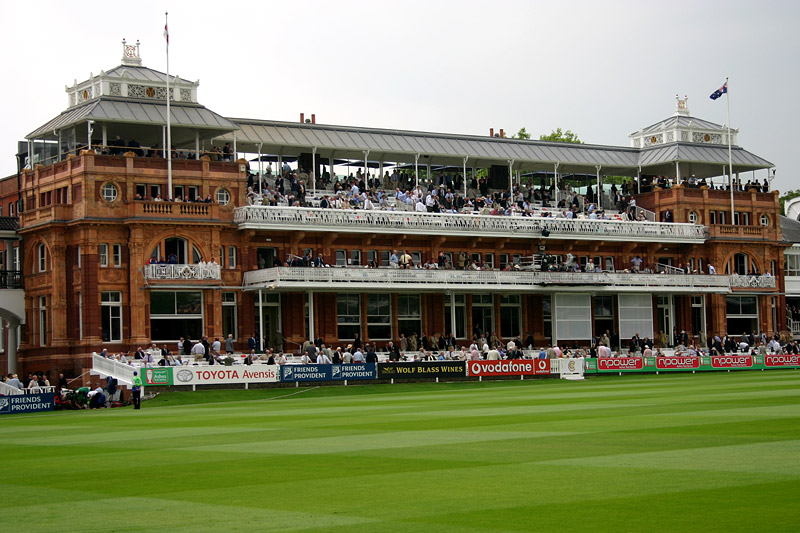
Lord's Pavilion is the HQ of MCC, who hold copyright of the Laws of Cricket

In 2010, the ICC published its Classification of Official Cricket (COC) which included the criteria with which a match must comply to achieve a desired categorisation. The purpose of the COC was to provide guidance on present and future match classification but, as in the 1947 definition, it was not to be applied retrospectively.

Essentially, the terms of the definition and the COC are that a match may be adjudged first-class if:

- it is of three or more days scheduled duration
- each team playing the match has eleven players
- each team may have two innings
- the match is played on natural, and not artificial, turf
- the match is played at a venue which meets certain standard criteria regarding venues
- the match conforms to the Laws of Cricket, except for only minor amendments
- the sport's governing body in the appropriate nation, or the ICC itself, recognises the match as first-class.

A Test match is a first-class match played between two ICC full member countries, subject to their current status at the ICC, and the application of ICC conditions when the match is played. Other ICC rulings have made it possible for international teams from associate members of the ICC to achieve first-class status, but this is dependent on the status of their opponents in a given match.

== Recognised matches and tournaments ==
In March 2024, the ICC published a new version of the COC, in which they have ruled:

Full Member men's and women's matches of three or more days' duration shall be regarded as First-Class, subject to the provisions of the First-Class match definition being complied with.

The 2024 COC also rules:

- Matches involving age-group teams up to and including under-19 (U19) shall not be classified as first-class.
- Only the governing bodies of Full ICC Members may decide the status of matches of three or more days' duration played in their countries.

In an appendix, the COC has a list of matches and tournaments which are "merely indicative" of the types of match that would meet the first-class definition:

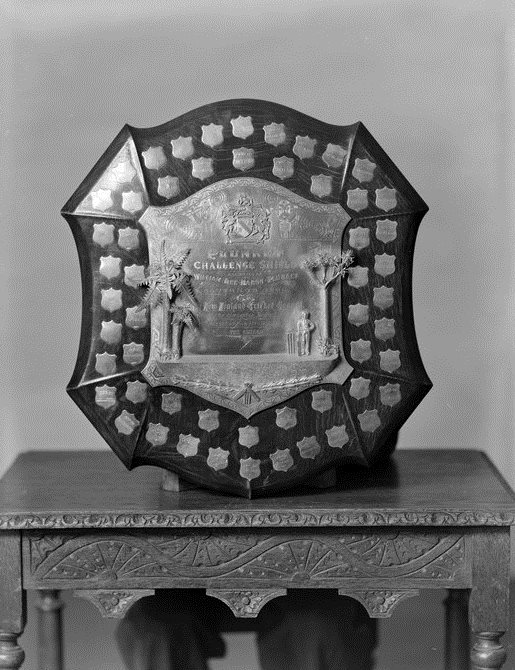
The Plunket Shield is awarded annually to New Zealand's first-class champions

- Test matches (Note: The ICC have ruled that matches involving an "A team" or an age-group team (e.g., U19) shall not be classified as Test matches.)
- Matches against domestic teams adjudged first-class, which are played by official touring teams
- Ahmad Shah Abdali 4-day Tournament (Afghanistan)
- Sheffield Shield (Australia)
- National Cricket League (Bangladesh; divisions)
- Bangladesh Cricket League (Bangladesh; zones)
- County Championship (England and Wales)
- Ranji Trophy (India; states)
- Duleep Trophy (India; zones)
- Irani Cup (India)
- Plunket Shield (New Zealand)
- Quaid-e-Azam Trophy (Pakistan)
- CSA 4-Day Domestic Series (South Africa)
- Major League Tournament (Sri Lanka)
- West Indies Championship (West Indies)
- Logan Cup (Zimbabwe)

== Retrospective statistical classification of matches played before the definitions ==
=== Issue for statisticians ===
Given the ICC ruling that their definition does not have retrospective effect, the statistical status (n.b., not the historical status) of matches played before 1947 (or before 1895 in Great Britain) is problematic for those cricket statisticians who wish to categorise earlier matches in the same way. They have responded by compiling their own match lists, and allocating a strictly unofficial "first-class status" to the matches they consider to have been of a high standard in the statistical sense. Obviously, this can only apply to matches with surviving scorecards. It is therefore a matter of opinion only, with no official support. Inevitable differences have arisen, and there have been variations in published cricket statistics.

Cricket statistics rely on the existence of scorecards, but these were rare before the 1772 season, and then largely incomplete or missing until after the 1825 season. As Harry Altham and E. W. Swanton, among others, have pointed out, matches of historical importance that are believed to have met the official definitions, assuming they featured teams of the necessary high standard, have been recorded since 1697 (having been in vogue since the 1660s).

=== Historically important matches ===
A key issue for the statisticians is when first-class cricket, for their statistical purposes, is deemed to have begun. Writing in 1951, Roy Webber argued that the majority of matches prior to 1864 (i.e., the year in which overarm bowling was legalised) "cannot be regarded as first-class", and their records are used "for their historical associations".

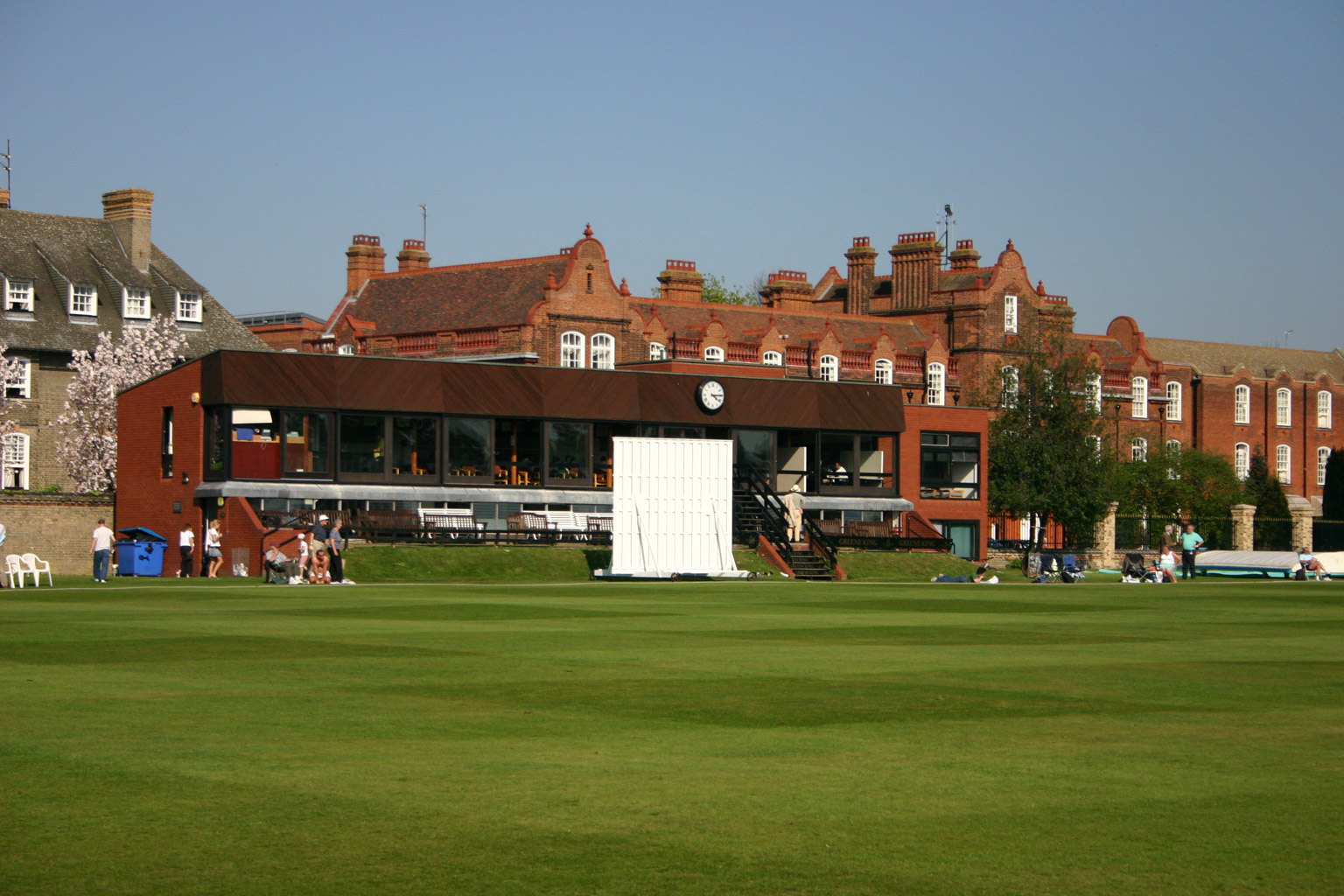
Fenner's, which hosted the opening match of the 1864 season

This drew a line between what was important historically, and what should form part of the statistical record. Hence, for pre-1895 (i.e., in Great Britain) cricket matches, "first-class" is essentially a statistical concept while the historical concept is broader and takes account of historical significance. Webber's rationale was that cricket was "generally weak before 1864" (there was a greater and increasingly more organised effort to promote county cricket from about that time), and match details were largely incomplete, especially bowling analyses, which hindered compilation of records. According to Webber's view, the inaugural first-class match was the opening game of the 1864 season between Cambridge University and MCC at Fenner's on 12 and 13 May, Cambridge winning by 6 wickets.

When the Association of Cricket Statisticians and Historians (ACS) published its Guide to First-Class Cricket Matches Played in the British Isles in 1982, it tentatively agreed with Webber's 1864 start date by saying that "the line between first-class and other matches becomes more easily discernible about that date". A year earlier, the ACS had published its Guide to Important Cricket Matches Played in the British Isles, 1709–1863 in which it listed all the known matches during that period which it considered to have historical importance. The ACS did stipulate that they had taken a more lenient view of importance regarding matches played in the 18th century than they did of matches played in the 19th century. As they explained, surviving details of 18th century matches are typically incomplete while there is a fairly comprehensive store of data about 19th century matches, certainly since 1825.

The status of other pre-1864 matches, including many in the ACS' Important Matches guide, which have left no scorecard, and for which only a brief announcement or report exists, must be based on other factors. Contemporary importance was often measured by the amount of money at stake, and the fact that a match was deemed important enough to be reported in the press. The 18th century matches in the ACS list were primarily compiled to assist historians. The earliest match known to have been accorded superior status in a contemporary report (i.e., termed "a great match" in this case), and to have been played for a large sum of money, was one in Sussex between two unnamed eleven-a-side teams contesting "fifty guineas apiece" in June 1697, a match of enormous historical significance but with no statistical data recorded.

=== Earlier statistical startpoints ===
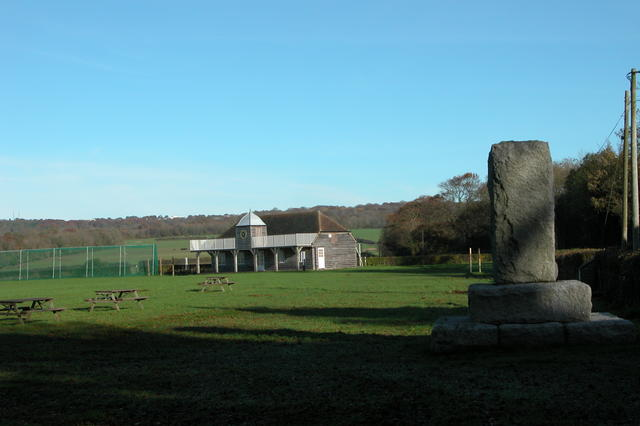
Broadhalfpenny Down

Subsequently, Webber's view was challenged by Bill Frindall who believed that 1815 should be the statistical startpoint, to encompass the entire roundarm bowling phase of cricket's history, although roundarm did not begin in earnest until 1827. In Frindall's view, the inaugural first-class match should have been the opening game of the 1815 season between MCC and Middlesex at Lord's on 31 May and 1 June, Middlesex winning by 16 runs. Notwithstanding Frindall's reputation, Webber's view has been revived and reinforced in recent times. For example, the Kent researcher Derek Carlaw began his study of Kent cricketers since 1806 by stating: "Part One is confined to players who appeared for Kent in important matches from 1806 to 1863 and first-class matches from 1864 to 1914".

On the internet, the CricketArchive (CA) and Cricinfo (CI) statistical databases both say the earliest first-class match was Hampshire v England at Broadhalfpenny Down on 24 and 25 June 1772. It was with this match that scorecards began to be completed and preserved on a frequent basis, enabling commencement of the sport's statistical record. At that time, cricket matches were played with a two-stump wicket and exclusively underarm bowling, although other features of the modern game had been introduced. The opinion of these databases was initially repudiated by both Wisden and Playfair Cricket Annual. Wisden agreed with Frindall by commencing its first-class records in 1815. Playfair supports Webber, and begins its records in 1864.

The ACS, however, eventually shifted its position, and adopted 1772 as its start point for first-class statistics. In November 2022, Wisden also decided to commence its statistical records in 1772. Wisden made clear, however, that they were not rewriting history—pointing out that "history is full of tweaks"—but seeking "statistical coherence" only, with no intention of degrading the status of what had been called "great or important" matches. They concluded that they hadn't "reinvented the wheel, but tightened a few (statistical) nuts" so that management of first-class statistics "will proceed more smoothly" in future. The ACS reported Wisden's decision in its "ACS News" page on 21 April 2022. The ACS stated that the agreement enabled a "shared approach to the compilation of statistics".

== See also ==
- List of first-class cricket records
- List of current first-class cricket teams
- Lists of cricket records
- Minor Counties Cricket

== Bibliography ==
- ACS (1981). A Guide to Important Cricket Matches Played in the British Isles 1709–1863. Nottingham: The Association of Cricket Statisticians and Historians. OCLC 85045528.
- ACS (1982). A Guide to First-class Cricket Matches Played in the British Isles. Nottingham: The Association of Cricket Statisticians and Historians. OCLC 10586869.
- Altham, H. S.; Swanton, E. W. (1962). A History of Cricket, Volume 1 (to 1914) (5th ed.). London: George Allen & Unwin. OCLC 894274808.
- Bowen, Rowland (1970). Cricket: A History of its Growth and Development. London: Eyre & Spottiswoode. ISBN 978-04-13278-60-9.
- Carlaw, Derek; Winnifrith, John (2020). Kent County Cricketers, A to Z: Part One (1806-1914) (PDF). Cardiff: The Association of Cricket Statisticians and Historians.
- Frindall, Bill, ed. (1998). The Wisden Book of Cricket Records (Fourth ed.). Alton, Hampshire: John Wisden & Co. Ltd. ISBN 978-07-47222-03-3.
- Haygarth, Arthur (1996) [1862]. Scores & Biographies, Volume 1 (1744–1826). Kennington: Frederick Lillywhite. ISBN 978-19-00592-23-9.
- McCann, Tim (2004). Sussex Cricket in the Eighteenth Century (PDF). Vol. 88. Lewes: West Sussex Record Office. ISBN 978-08-54450-55-8.
- Playfair (2018). Marshall, Ian (ed.). Playfair Cricket Annual. London: Headline. ISBN 978-14-72249-82-1.
- Rae, Simon (1998). W. G. Grace: A Life. London: Faber & Faber. ISBN 978-05-71178-55-1.
- Webber, Roy (1951). The Playfair Book of Cricket Records. London: Playfair Books Ltd. OCLC 753176177.
- Wisden (1948). Preston, Hubert (ed.). Wisden Cricketers' Almanack (85th ed.). London: Sporting Handbooks Ltd. OCLC 851705816.
- Wisden (2019). Booth, Lawrence (ed.). Wisden Cricketers' Almanack (156th ed.). London: John Wisden & Co. ISBN 978-14-72964-05-2.
