= Parlon =

Parlon is an Irish surname. Notable people with the surname include:

- Cathal Parlon (21st century), Irish hurler
- Tom Parlon (born 1953), Irish politician

== See also ==
- Parlin (surname)
- Pardon (name)
