= Pardon (disambiguation) =

A pardon is the forgiveness of a crime.

Pardon may also refer to:

== Film and television ==
- Pardon (film), a 2005 Turkish film
- The Pardon, a 2013 American drama film
- "Pardon" (Doctors), a 2004 television episode

== Other uses ==
- Pardon (ceremony), a Breton form of pilgrimage
- pardon (magazine), a German satirical biweekly 1962–1982
- Pardon (name), a list of people with the surname or given name
- Pardon of Assisi, Plenary Indulgence granted by the Catholic Church under certain prescribed conditions

== See also ==
- Le Pardon, French title of the 2020 Iranian film Ballad of a White Cow
- "Pardon Me", a 1999 song by American rock band Incubus
- "Pardon Me", a 2005 song by Weezer from the album Make Believe
