= George Frederick Pardon =

English journalist and writer

George Frederick Pardon (1824–1884) was an English journalist and writer, especially on sports and games, where he used the pseudonym Rawdon Crawley or Captain Crawley.

== Life ==
Pardon was born in London, educated at a private school, and at the age of 15 entered the printing office of Stevens & Pardon in Bell Yard, Temple Bar. Soon afterwards he contributed articles to The Old Monthly and The Sunbeam, periodicals edited by John Abraham Heraud. From 1841–2 he sub-edited the Evening Star, founded by Feargus O'Connor, and became close to most of the radical Chartist leaders. He made a serious financial loss on the Star, for which he was the London publisher from July 1842 to February 1843.

From 1847 to 1850 he edited The People's and Howitt's Journal, and in summer 1850 he joined the staff of John Cassell as editor of the Working Man's Friend.

In 1851 Pardon launched the Illustrated Exhibitor, a weekly description of the Great Exhibition, which was revived in 1862, and then merged in the Magazine of Art. In 1851 he also planned and edited for Cassell the Popular Educator and other educational publications in Cassell's stable. In 1854–5 he was engaged as editor of the Family Friend and the Home Companion; and he assisted in launching Orr's Circle of the Sciences.

Pardon died suddenly on 5 August 1884, at the Fleur de Lis Hotel, Canterbury, while on a visit.

== Works ==
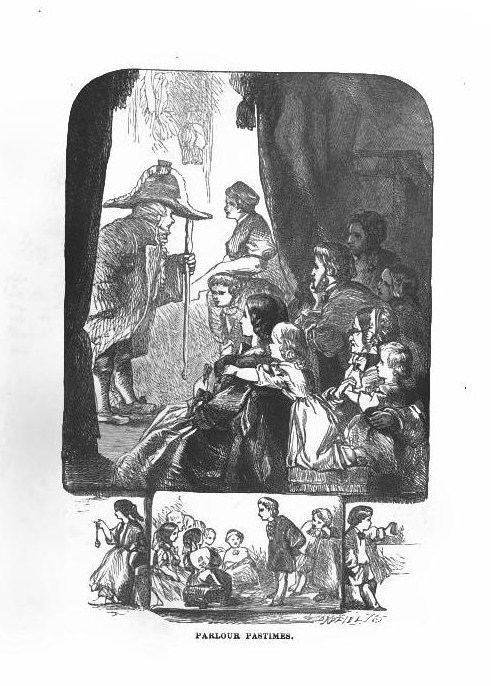
Frontispiece to Parlour Pastimes: A Repertoire of Acting Charades, Fire-Side Games, Enigmas, Riddles, Charades, Conundrums, Arithmetical and Mechanical Puzzles, Parlour Magic, Etc. Etc., 1868, by George Frederick Pardon

In 1861–2 Pardon wrote for Messrs. Routledge a Guide to the Exhibition, the Popular Guide to London, with handbooks on chess, draughts, and card games, later combined as "Hoyle Modernised". Under the pseudonym "Captain Crawley" he produced The Billiard Book, Games for Gentlemen, and about twenty other volumes on games, sports, and pastimes, most of them with American editions. For the ninth edition of the Encyclopædia Britannica he wrote the articles on "Billiards" and "Bagatelle".

Other works were:

- The juvenile museum: or, child's library of amusement and instruction, by 'quiet George'. 1849
- The Faces in the Fire; the Shadows on the Wall; with other Tales and Sketches, London, 1856.
- Dogs, their Sagacity, Instinct, and Uses, illustrated by Harrison Weir, London, 1857 and 1877.
- Stories about Animals, London [1858].
- Stories about Birds, London [1858].
- Tales from the Operas, London, 1858.
- Boldheart the Warrior, and his Adventures in the Haunted Wood: a Tale of the Times of good King Arthur, illustrated by Gustave Doré, London, 1859.
- Caleb Worthington's Wish.
- Illustrious Women who have distinguished themselves for Virtue, Piety, and Benevolence, London, [1868].
- Noble by Heritage, a novelette, London, 1877.
- The diverting historie of Renard the fox, newly ed. and done into Engl. by 'Quiet George'.

Also The Little Traveller, Parlour Pastimes, and juvenile literature.

== Family ==
In 1847 Pardon married Rosina Wade, who died in 1889. They had three sons, Charles Frederick, Sydney Herbert, and Edgar Searles, all of them writers and journalists, and associated with Wisden Cricketers' Almanack.
