= Norman Preston =

English cricket journalist

- Born: Norman Preston; 18 March 1903
- Died: 6 March 1980 (aged 76)
- Occupation: Sports journalist
- Known for: Editor of Wisden
- Spouse: Edith Mary Caroline (Molly)
- Children: Brian, David, Helen
- Awards: MBE

Norman Preston, MBE (18 March 1903 – 6 March 1980) was an English cricket journalist.

He began his career with the old Pardon's Cricket Reporting Agency in 1933 and served on three overseas tours as Reuters' correspondent. He succeeded his father, Hubert Preston, as editor of Wisden Cricketers' Almanack and was in charge for 29 editions from 1952 until his death in 1980. He was awarded the MBE in the Queen's Silver Jubilee Honours List in 1977. He was succeeded as editor of Wisden by John Woodcock.

He and his wife Molly had three children.
