= Pardon (name) =

Pardon is a given name and a surname. It may refer to:

== Given name ==
- Pardon Ndhlovu (born 1987), Zimbabwean marathon runner
- Pardon Tillinghast (1625-1718), early settler from England of Providence, Rhode Island, merchant, public official and pastor
- Pardon E. Tillinghast (1836-1905), American politician and Chief Justice of the Rhode Island Supreme Court

== Surname ==
- Billy Pardon (1903-1969), Australian rules footballer
- Charles Pardon (1850-1890), British sportswriter
- Dererk Pardon (born 1996), American basketball player for Hapoel Be'er Sheva of the Israeli Basketball Premier League
- John Pardon (born 1989), American mathematician
- Jorge Pardon (1905-1977), Peruvian footballer
- Lisa Pardon (born 1982), New Zealand basketball player
- Noël Pardon (1854-1910), French colonial administrator
- Sydney Pardon (1855-1925), British sports journalist, brother of Charles Pardon
