= Hubert Preston =

English journalist

Hubert Preston (16 December 1868 – 6 August 1960) was a journalist and writer who was editor of Wisden Cricketers' Almanack for eight years from the 1944 edition to the 1951 edition. He contributed to 51 editions of the Almanack, and was the oldest editor of the publication, being 74 when he started in the position. He became a partner in the Cricket Reporting Agency in 1920.

== Career ==
Preston was educated at the City of London School and became a reporter on the Manchester Guardian newspaper. After a period in Canada as a farmer, he returned to the UK in 1895 and joined the Cricket Reporting Agency run by Sydney Pardon, which was responsible for the production of Wisden as well as reports for the Press Association and newspapers. He remained with the agency for 56 years until he retired as editor of Wisden in 1951 and was succeeded by his son, Norman Preston, who edited Wisden from 1952 to 1980. He also reported on soccer matches. In 1944 he restored the "Notes by the Editor" feature to Wisden which had been stopped under the previous editor. In 1947 he introduced a full page profiles of four England Players in the 1946/7 tour, which was new to Wisden. His son Norman wrote these first reports, but subsequent full page profiles were produced by eight other writers that Preston chose. He never wrote a profile himself.

In 1945 Preston wrote of the England Australia game "War meant the home side experienced difficulty in finding the best of the available players. Some of the chosen men, coming almost straight from battlefields, must have regarded the first encounter primarily as a reunion with old friends, so that a thoroughly serious view of the game, such as the Australians clearly held, was too much to expect".

Preston was known by the nickname HP or Deafy. He was deaf for much of his life, using an ear trumpet before battery-operated hearing aids became available.

He was a strong supporter of the County Championship becoming two divisions, according to his notes in Wisden 1949.

Upon Preston's death in 1960, Neville Cardus wrote that he was "with [Sydney] Pardon and Stewart Caine, the most courteous and best-mannered man ever to be seen in a Press Box on a cricket ground". His funeral service was held at St Bride's Church in Fleet Street, London, on 17 August 1960.
