= Parlin (surname) =

Parlin is a surname. Notable people with the surname include:

- Charles Coolidge Parlin (1872–1942), American manager and pioneer of market research
- Bob Parlin (born 1963), American educator and LGBTQ activist

== See also ==
- Barling (surname)
- Parlon, another surname
