= Wisden Cricketers' Almanack =

British cricket almanac

- 2019 edition
- Editor: Lawrence Booth
- Categories: Cricket
- Publisher: Bloomsbury
- Total circulation: 50,000 (2006)
- Founder: John Wisden
- First issue: 1864; 162 years ago
- Country: United Kingdom
- Based in: London, England
- Website: wisdenalmanack.com

Wisden Cricketers' Almanack, or simply Wisden, colloquially the Bible of Cricket, is a cricket reference book published annually in the United Kingdom. The description "Bible of cricket" (or variations thereof) has been applied to Wisden since the early 1900s.

Between 1998 and 2005, an Australian edition of Wisden was published. An Indian version, edited by Suresh Menon, was produced annually from 2013 to 2018, but discontinued following the publication of a combined 2019 and 2020 issue.

== History ==
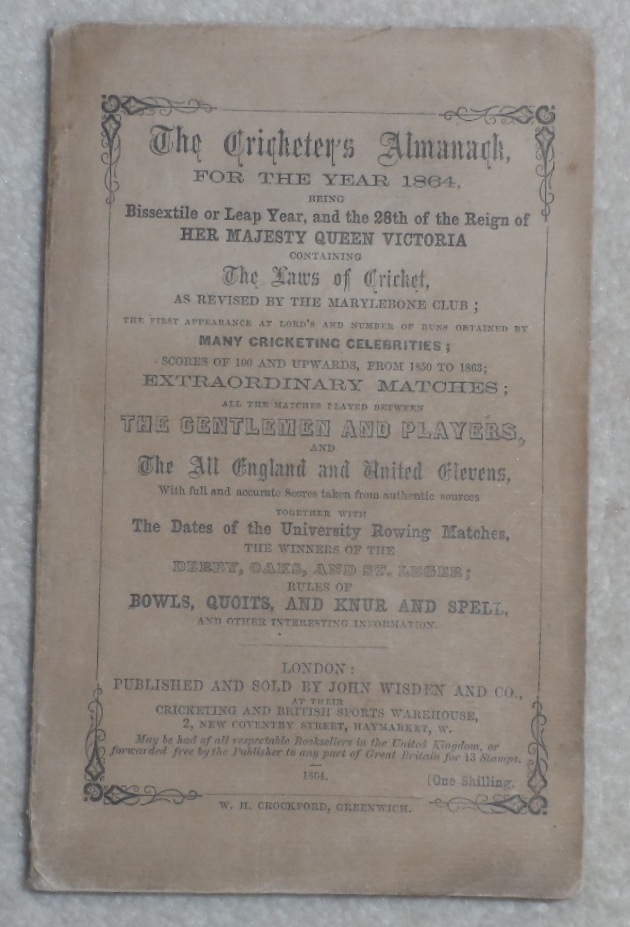
1864 Wisden front cover, supplied by Wisdens.org

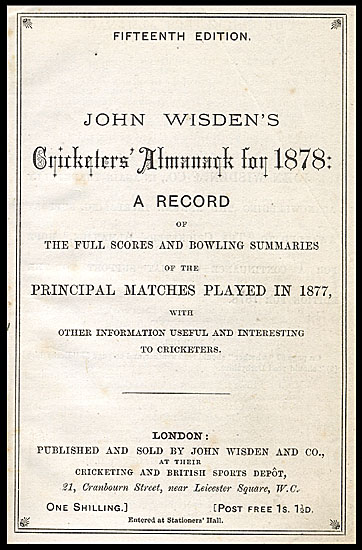
Wisden 1878 edition

During the Victorian era there was a growing public appetite for sporting trivia, especially of a statistical nature. Wisden was founded in 1864 by the English cricketer John Wisden (1826–84) as a competitor to Fred Lillywhite's The Guide to Cricketers. Its annual publication has continued uninterrupted to the present day, making it the longest running sports annual in history. In 1869, the sixth edition became the first published under its current title, prior to which it had been The Cricketer's Almanack (with the apostrophe before the "s"). The first edition may have been based on a diary written by Francis Emilius Cary Elwes in 1863 and discovered in 2016, although to what extent this was the case remains open to question. This diary /manuscript has been photographed and transcribed with explanatory notes. It can be studied at wisdenssecret.com

Charles Pardon, with George Kelly King, founded the Cricket Reporting Agency (CRA) in 1880. From Pardon's becoming editor of Wisden in 1887, the editor was nearly always a CRA partner and the CRA was responsible for the editorial production of the Almanack, until in 1965 it merged with the Press Association (PA).

Wisden was acquired and published by Robert Maxwell's publishing conglomerate, Macdonald, in the 1970s. Cricket fan Sir John Paul Getty Jr., bought the company, John Wisden & Co., in 1993 and in December 2008 it was sold to A&C Black, which is owned by Bloomsbury. The company presented the Wisden Trophy, for Test matches between England and West Indies, in 1963 to celebrate its 100th edition.

The Little Wonder: The Remarkable History of Wisden by Robert Winder was published in 2013 ("The Little Wonder" was John Wisden's nickname). In October 2013, an all-time Test World XI was announced to mark the 150th anniversary of Wisden Cricketers' Almanack.

== Editions ==
Although small in page size, Wisden is a very thick book (over 1,500 pages in modern editions) with a distinctive bright yellow cover that it has carried since the 75th edition in 1938. Prior to that, covers varied between yellow, buff and salmon pink. That edition was also the first to display the famous woodcut of two cricketers, by Eric Ravilious, on its cover. It is published each April, just before the start of the English domestic cricket season. Since 2003, the front cover has featured a photograph of one or more current cricketers, (Note: Michael Vaughan was the first person to be so honoured.) whilst a smaller version of the woodcut now appears on each volume's spine (an exception being the 150th edition in 2013, which reverted to the previous format).

It is produced in both hardcover and softcover versions. Since 2006, a larger format edition has been published on an experimental basis. This is said to be in response to requests from readers who find the print size of the standard edition hard to read. It is around twice the traditional size and was published in a limited edition of 5,000. It is not a large print book as such, as the print will still be of a size found in many standard books.

From 2011 an Epub version, The Shorter Wisden, has been available in online bookstores. Described by the publishers as a "distillation of what's best in its bigger brother", it includes the Notes by the Editor, all the articles, reviews, obituaries, and the reports on all England's Test matches for the year in question. Excluded are the statistics and other cricket reports contained within the original Almanack.

Work undertaken by the Association of Cricket Statisticians and Historians has found small errors in around 70% of the scorecards published in Wisden before 1970, as these were based on figures submitted by local reporters rather than official sources.

== Contents ==
The contents of a contemporary edition include the following sections:

=== Comment ===
Around a hundred pages of articles on cricketing topics, including the introductory "Notes by the Editor", which address often controversial cricket issues and always provoke discussion in the cricketing world.

=== Awards ===
The traditional Wisden Cricketers of the Year awards, which date back to 1889.

- Wisden Women's Leading Cricketer in the World
- Wisden Men's Leading Cricketer in the World

=== Records ===
Traditionally the main source for key statistics about the game, although it has never attempted to be comprehensive. Nowadays the records section is intended to be complementary to the much more detailed data available online at Wisden's associated website ESPNcricinfo.

=== English cricket ===
By far the largest section of the book. Hugely detailed coverage, including scorecards of every First class game played in the previous English summer, and summaries of minor counties, second eleven, university, school and premier club cricket, as well as the Village Cup.

=== Overseas cricket ===
Full coverage of all international cricket and brief coverage of domestic first class cricket outside England.

=== Law and administration ===
This short section, 80 pages in the 2010 edition, has information about and addresses of official cricket bodies as well as the full laws of cricket, together with appendices. There are also details of meetings held by official bodies, including their major decisions, as well as articles about the Duckworth–Lewis method and Powerplays. The laws have been omitted from the most recent editions.

=== The Wisden Review ===
This section includes the Chronicle (noteworthy events from the previous year), reviews of other cricket books published in the year, noteworthy retirements and the highly regarded obituaries section among others.

==== Book reviews and the Wisden Book of the Year ====
John Arlott wrote the Books section from its inception in the 1950 edition until the 1992 edition, just before he died, with the exception of the 1979 and 1980 editions, when Gordon Ross took over. Beginning with the 1993 edition, the Books section has been written by a different person each year, often someone "with a literary reputation first and a separate enthusiasm for cricket". The first such reviewer was J. L. Carr, and others have included Sebastian Faulks (1997) and Leslie Thomas (1998).

An award for the Wisden Book of the Year was inaugurated in the 2003 edition. The winners have been:

Edition	Book	Author	Reviewer
2003	Bodyline Autopsy	David Frith	Frank Keating
2004	No Coward Soul	Stephen Chalke and Derek Hodgson	Barry Norman
2005	On and Off the Field	Ed Smith	Ramachandra Guha
2006	Ashes 2005	Gideon Haigh	Ed Smith
2007	Brim Full of Passion	Wasim Khan	Peter Oborne
2008	Tom Cartwright: The Flame Still Burns	Stephen Chalke	Patrick Collins
2009	Sweet Summers: The Classic Cricket Writing of J. M. Kilburn	Duncan Hamilton (editor)	Patrick Collins
2010	Harold Larwood: The Authorized Biography of the World's Fastest Bowler	Duncan Hamilton	Robin Martin-Jenkins
2011	The Cricketer's Progress: Meadowland to Mumbai	Eric Midwinter	Gideon Haigh
2012	Fred Trueman: The Authorised Biography	Chris Waters	Harry Pearson
2013	Bookie Gambler Fixer Spy	Ed Hawkins	John Crace
2014	Driving Ambition	Andrew Strauss	Jonathan Liew
2015	Wounded Tiger: A History of Cricket in Pakistan	Peter Oborne	Patrick Collins
2016	The Test: My Life, and the Inside Story of the Greatest Ashes Series	Simon Jones and Jon Hotten	Duncan Hamilton
2017	Following On	Emma John	Marcus Berkmann
2018	A Clear Blue Sky	Jonny Bairstow and Duncan Hamilton	Kamila Shamsie
2019	Steve Smith's Men	Geoff Lemon	Tanya Aldred
2020	Cricket 2.0: Inside the T20 Revolution	Tim Wigmore and Freddie Wilde	Alex Massie
2021	This is Cricket: In the Spirit of the Game	Daniel Melamud	Emma John
2022	Who Only Cricket Know: Hutton's Men in the West Indies 1953–54	David Woodhouse	Vic Marks
2023	An Island's Eleven: The Story of Sri Lankan Cricket	Nicholas Brookes	Nicholas Lezard
2024	Sticky Dogs and Stardust: When the Legends Played in the Leagues	Scott Oliver	Anthony McGowan
2025	One Hell of a Life: Brian Close – Daring, Defiant and Daft	Stephen Chalke	David Woodhouse
2026	Chasing Jessop: The Mystery of England Cricket's Oldest Record	Simon Wilde	Stephen Moss

=== The Almanack ===
This section contains fixtures for the forthcoming international and English domestic season, the international schedule for the upcoming seven years and the Index of Unusual Occurrences featuring quirky cricketing stories. A selection from recent years includes: Rabbit burns down pavilion; Hot-air balloons stop play; Cricketers arrested for dancing naked; Fine leg arrives by parachute; Fried calamari stopped play; Umpire locked in ground overnight..

== Editors ==
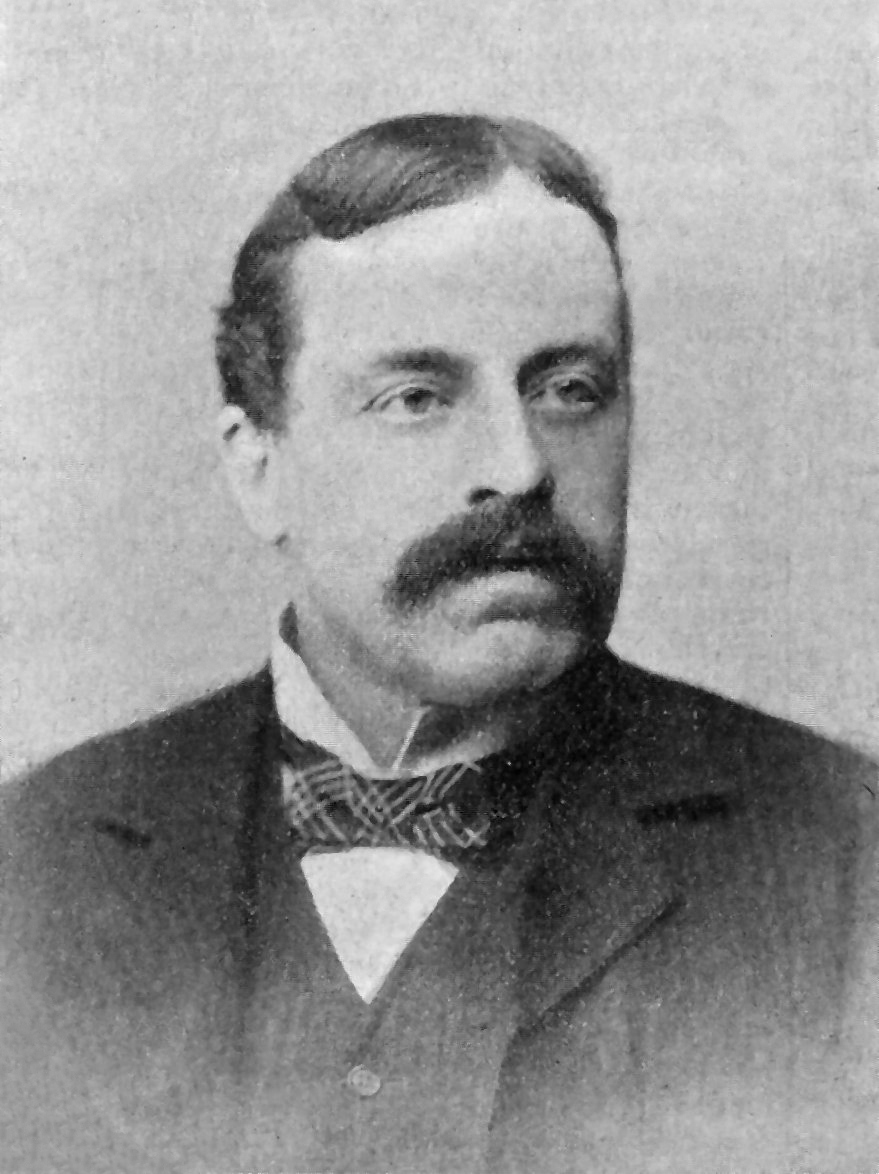
Sydney Pardon; editor from 1891 to 1925

Wisden has had seventeen editors:

- W. H. Crockford/W. H. Knight (1864–1869)
- W. H. Knight (1870–1879)
- G. H. West (1880–1886)
- Charles F. Pardon (1887–1890)
- Sydney Pardon (1891–1925)
- C. Stewart Caine (1926–1933)
- Sydney J. Southerton (1934–1935)
- Wilfrid H. Brookes (1936–1939)
- Haddon Whitaker (1940–1943)
- Hubert Preston (1944–1951)
- Norman Preston (1952–1980)
- John Woodcock (1981–1986)
- Graeme Wright (1987–1992, 2001–2002)
- Matthew Engel (1993–2000, 2004–2007)
- Tim de Lisle (2003)
- Scyld Berry (2008–2011)
- Lawrence Booth (2012 to present)

Booth's deputy, promoted to the role of co-editor, is Hugh Chevallier.

== Contributors ==
Wisden has had a large number of contributors. The majority involve match reports for the various fixtures recorded each year, but also biographies, reviews and opinion. Many great cricket writers have written for Wisden, along with many great cricketers. Neville Cardus contributed many notable essays and for many years John Arlott was responsible for the book reviews.

== Awards ==
Since 1902 (with the occasional exception) Wisden has honoured five cricketers for their outstanding achievements over the previous year. Further details, with a full list of recipients of the award, can be found at Wisden Cricketers of the Year.

- Wisden Women's Leading Cricketer in the World
- Wisden Men's Leading Cricketer in the World

== Indices and anthologies ==
At least two indices to Wisden have been published:

- Index to Wisden, 1864–1943 by Rex Pogson (1944)
- An Index to Wisden Cricketers' Almanack 1864–1984 by Derek Barnard (1985)

An index from 1985 onwards is available in pdf form on the Wisden web site.

A number of anthologies of articles from Wisden have been published. These include:

- Wisden Anthology by Benny Green (1979)
- Wisden Book of Obituaries edited by Benny Green (1986)
- The Wisden Papers of Neville Cardus (Wisden Papers) edited by Benny Green (1989)
- The Wisden Papers edited by Benny Green (1990)
- The Concise Wisden: An Illustrated Anthology of 125 Years edited by Benny Green (1990)
- Wisden Anthology: 1864–1900 edited by Benny Green (1992)
- Wisden Anthology: 1901–1939 edited by Benny Green (1992)
- Wisden Anthology: 1940–1963 edited by Benny Green (1992)
- Wisden Anthology: 1964–1982 edited by Benny Green (1992)
- Endless Summer: 140 Years of Australian Cricket in Wisden edited by Gideon Haigh (2003)
- The Wisden Collection: Volume 1 edited by Graeme Wright (2004)
- The Wisden Collection: Volume 2 edited by Graeme Wright (2005)
- Wisden at Lords: An Illustrated Anthology edited by Graeme Wright (2005)
- Wisden Anthology: 1978–2006: Cricket's Age of Revolution edited by Stephen Moss (2006)

== Style, design, graphical content and materials ==
For the first 32 years of its existence the Almanack was only published in softback form, in a paper cover that varied in colour through the years between shades of pink, yellow and buff. From the 33rd (1896) edition onwards hardback copies became available at twice the price of the softback.

In 1889 the Almanack published its first photoplate, commissioned to accompany the Editor's nomination of six great Bowlers of the Year. From then on a photoplate appeared each year up to and including 1915. The plates were attached to an un-numbered page in the Almanack and had a tissue protector. They continued to show a number of selected players of the year except in 1896, when W G Grace was the only subject, and in 1913, when the 50th edition published no selections but celebrated John Wisden himself. After a two-year hiatus during World War 1 the plate reappeared in 1918, but as a mechanically printed image depicting five School Bowlers of the Year. The image in the 1919 edition continued to reflect wartime exigencies with its five Public School Cricketers of the Year before normal service resumed in 1920 with five Batsmen of the Year. From then on, with four exceptions (see Wisden Cricketers of the Year), the norm was to include an image of five Cricketers of the Year. It was not until 1938 that other photographs were introduced.

From 1933 to 1939 the softback editions of the Almanack contained a cricket bat bookmark attached by the blade to the inside of the spine with yellow string. The bat handle of the bookmark is easily lost and softbacks with entirely intact bookmarks command a price premium.

In 1938 the Almanack underwent some significant style, design and material changes under the supervision of Robert Henry Harling. He introduced a new typeface and new designs for the front covers of both the softback and hardback editions. A yellow linen cover featuring the iconic woodcut by Eric Ravilious replaced the paper wrapper of the softback edition – a reason why softbacks from this time onwards are often referred to as "linens" even though they changed to a cloth-effect card binding in 1957. The design of the softback from 1938 onwards is probably the one most associated with the word "Wisden" in the mind of the general public.

There was a change to the orientation of the gilt lettering on the spines of hardbacks from 1941 to 1948. This was probably required by, and then a relict of, the slimness of the volumes published during World War 2. Excepting the 1963 centenary softback, the external appearance of both types of the Almanack then remained substantially unchanged until 1965 when the hardback was issued with a dust jacket. This was printed on yellow paper with the same design as the softback, giving a uniformity of appearance to both formats.

Between 1965 and 1978 the woodcut and text elements of the softback covers and the hardback dust jackets were printed in a variety of colours before reverting to black on yellow from 1979 onwards. Since that time some other changes have occurred to the style, design and materials:

- Between 1982 and 1984 the hardback dust jackets were printed on white paper
- Colour photographs first appeared in the Almanack in 1988
- From 1994 the hardback dust jackets were laminated, making them more resistant to wear and tear
- In 2001 the layout of the front board of the hardback was changed
- In 2003 a new style of photo dust jacket was introduced, although readers were informed that those who preferred the "traditional cover" could order one free from the publisher. This offer did not last: from the following year onwards a charge was made for providing these covers.

Minor changes of style have taken place throughout the Almanack's history, and are documented in a collector's guide that was updated and reprinted in 2011.

== Facsimile editions ==
Due to their rarity the early editions of Wisden, and editions published during the two World Wars, are rare and expensive. However, every edition up to 1946 is also available in facsimile form.

The first facsimile set was printed by Billing & Sons in 1960. Approximately 150 softback copies were produced of each year from 1864 to 1878 and made available either as part of a set or as singles. The facsimiles are clearly marked with an entry in capital letters at the bottom of the title page: "Facsimile edition 1960 made and printed in Great Britain by Billing and Sons Ltd., Guildford and London".

Lowe and Brydone produced another print run of the first 15 years in 1974. The run was limited again to 150 softback sets. These facsimiles are marked with an entry in capital letters at the bottom of the title page: "Second facsimile edition made and printed in Great Britain by Lowe and Brydone (Printers) Limited".

In 1991 John Wisden & Co Ltd produced its own facsimile set in a distinctive yellow box. This again comprised editions from 1864 to 1878 inclusive and was limited to 1000 sets. The individual books are not strictly facsimiles, and cannot be mistaken for originals, because although they include a copy of the original covers they are hardbound in red boards with "WISDEN FACSIMILE" in gilt on the front and the set number – "No. X of 1000" – on the back. Internally there is also an entry to the effect that the editions are facsimiles at the bottom of each title page: "This facsimile edition is published in 1991 by John Wisden & Co. Ltd. and printed by The Eastern Press Ltd., Reading".

In recent years a more extensive range of facsimiles has been produced by the Willows Publishing Company Ltd. As of early 2014, softback and hardback editions up to and including 1946 have been published. Like the Wisden facsimile set, the Willows softback facsimiles up to 1937 are hardbound, in tan cloth with gilt embossing, but from 1938 onwards they are true facsimiles with yellow linen covers. The hardback editions are also true facsimiles, with dark brown covers upon which the original gilt embossing is reproduced. Internally all Willows editions are identified as reprints at the base of the title page and limited edition numbers, where applicable, are also marked on the binding or cover.

The first three facsimile sets reproduced the wrong back cover for the 1878 edition – they incorrectly showed a list of articles supplied by John Wisden & Co. The Willows facsimile contains the correct advertisement, for a book on Oxford and Cambridge cricket matches from 1827 to 1876.

To celebrate the 150th edition, a facsimile of the 1864 edition was offered by John Wisden & Co as an incentive for those who subscribed to both the 2013 and 2014 editions. The facsimile offer was repeated in 2014 for those willing to subscribe to the Almanack by direct debit. This is not a true facsimile as the back cover does not reproduce the "List of Articles" of the original, but instead on the inside there is an advertisement for Wisden reprints from the Willows Publishing Company and on the back a celebration of 150 years of Wisden. At the bottom of the back cover information is provided about the reprint: "This reprint of the first edition of Wisden was produced in 2013 for the publisher, John Wisden & Co, an imprint of Bloomsbury Publishing Plc. Printed and bound by MPG Books."

Facsimile dust jackets are available for editions of Wisden from 1965 to 2003 to replace those that have been lost or damaged. They are also offered from 2004 onward as "traditional covers" that can be substituted for the original photo dust jackets. Supplied by Wisden's "official dust jacket supplier", these jackets are laminated and are printed in black on yellow (unlike the original jackets issued with the editions from 1965 to 1978 that incorporated colour elements). Replacement dust jackets are also clearly distinguishable from the originals as they are marked on the back cover with the words "REPLACEMENT DUST JACKET".

The same supplier offers traditional design dust jackets for editions from 1946 to 1964. Although these mimic the appearance of the softback covers they are not true facsimiles as the original hardback editions were never issued with dust jackets.

On 1 December 2018 Willows Publishing sold all their remaining stock of circa 2500 books to www.wisdenauction.com

== Print runs ==
The size of Wisden print runs is of considerable interest to collectors as rarity has a very strong influence on the value of individual editions.

The most reliable, or rather most widely quoted, source of information on print runs is an article by Leslie Gutteridge titled "A History of Wisden" published in the 1963 Almanack. In this article the writer states that it had proved impossible to trace any printing orders earlier than 1936, having earlier mentioned that records had been lost during the Second World War as a result of two attacks on the publisher and Wisden's Mortlake factory.

Despite the lack of early records Gutteridge notes that editions from 1889 to 1901, except 1896 and 1900, ran to two impressions (the word "impression" rather than "edition" is used throughout this section to avoid confusion with Wisden's use of "edition" in the book's title). He also notes in passing the rarity of the 1875 edition, though "not ... so scarce as the first issue of 1864", without providing specific details.

It is for the years from 1936 onwards that Gutteridge puts numbers to the print runs, providing either combined figures, or a breakdown of softback and/or hardback numbers, for each year to 1949:

Year	Total	Softback	Hardback
1936	8,500	–	–
1937	8,000	–	–
1938	–	12,000	n/k
1939	–	12,000	n/k
1940	–	8,000	n/k
1941	4,000	3,200	800
1942	5,000	4,100	900
1943	7,000	5,600	1,400
1944	7,000	5,600	1,400
1945	8,000	6,500	1,500
1946	16,000	11,000	5,000
1947	20,000	14,000	6,000
1948	21,000	14,500	6,500
1949	31,500	21,000	10,500

After 1949 he notes that numbers diminished, although at the time he wrote the article sales of the softback and hardback editions were still 11,000 and 10,000 respectively. It is likely that these figures were greatly exceeded in the centenary year as the 1963 edition ran to three impressions.

In more recent years sales of the 2006 edition exceeded 50,000 in total. The size of the print run was based on the publisher's belief that England's successful Ashes campaign the previous summer would attract considerable public interest.

Although unsupported by any reliable documentation, it is almost certain that print runs were reduced during the First World War. The 1916 edition, also containing as it does the obituary of W G Grace, is the most expensive 20th century Wisden.

The smallest recent print runs are believed to be for the years 1969 to 1971.

== Collecting Wisdens ==
Collecting Wisdens is popular among cricket followers, and early editions command high prices. The first edition, only 112 pages long, sold for one shilling. Rare copies of the early editions can sell for thousands of pounds.

== See also ==
- Wisden Asia Cricket
- Wisden 100
