= Charles Pardon =

Editor and sportswriter (1850–1890)

Charles Frederick Pardon (28 March 1850 - 18 April 1890) was editor of Wisden Cricketers' Almanack between 1887 and 1890. His father was the journalist George Frederick Pardon.

It was during his time as editor that the Wisden Cricketers of the Year awards began. After his death at age 40, his brother Sydney Pardon took over as editor for 35 years. Charles, Sydney, and another brother, Edgar, founded the Pardon's Cricket Reporting Agency in the 1870s.
