= Sydney Pardon =

English sports journalist

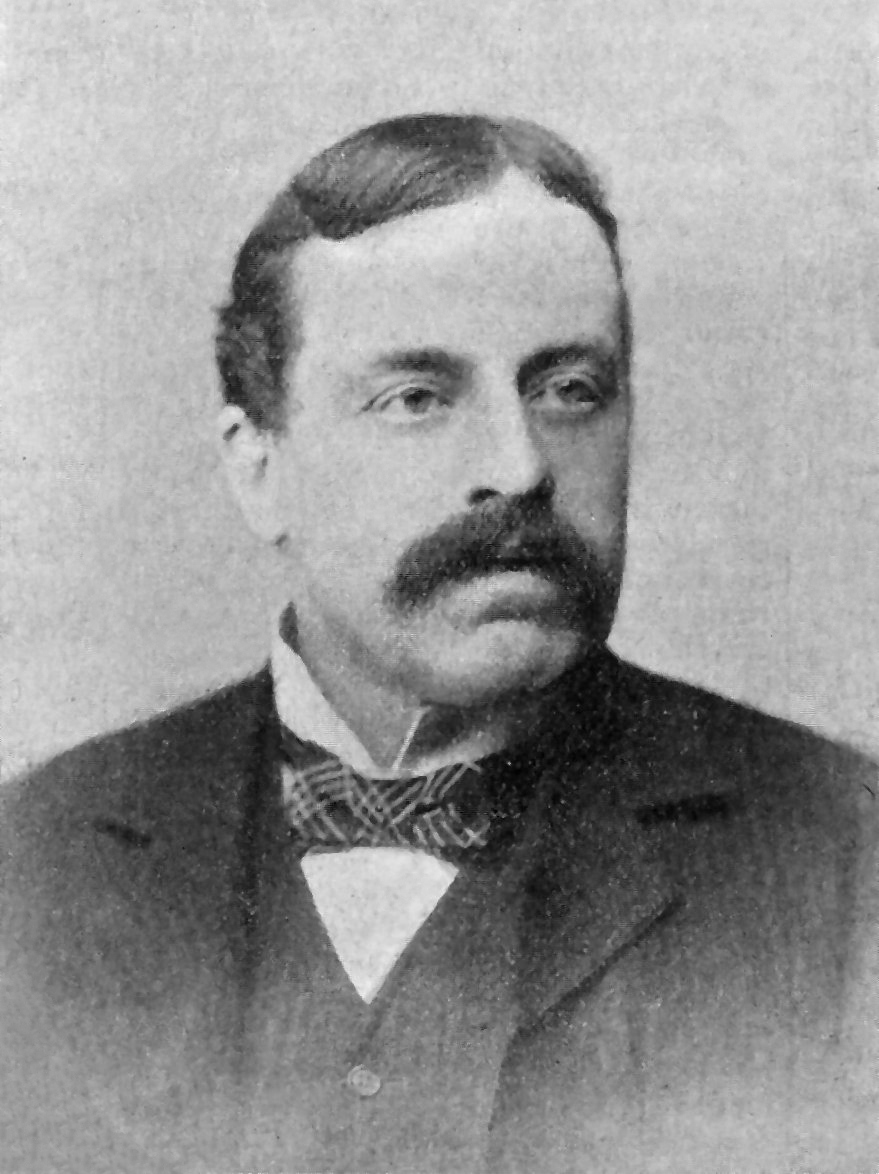
Sydney Pardon

Sydney Herbert Pardon (23 September 1855 – 20 November 1925) was a sports journalist who was the editor of Wisden Cricketers' Almanack for 35 editions, from 1891 until his death. His father was the journalist George Frederick Pardon.

He took over the editorship of Wisden following the death of his brother, Charles. He was considered to be one of Wisden's most successful editors. He introduced the "Notes by the Editor" feature in 1901, and did much to get throwing, a major problem in the 1890s, stamped out. L. E. S. Gutteridge wrote of him: "His was a cultured mind. He had definite opinions and was prepared to state them. His editorials make most interesting reading and his influence on the growth of the game throughout the world was immense."

In 1892, he introduced a comprehensive obituary section. In 1896, for the first time Wisden appeared in a cloth-bound (hardback) edition as well as paperback. In 1910 he memorably wrote that the England selectors had "touched the confines of lunacy". In 1924, an issue of Wisden first passed the one thousand page mark.

With his brothers Charles and Edgar, he set up the Cricket Reporting Agency in 1880, which provided match reports for Reuters and the Press Association.
