= Cricket Reporting Agency =

The Cricket Reporting Agency (CRA) was founded by Charles Pardon and George Kelly King in 1880. Throughout its 85-year existence, the CRA provided the Press Association (PA) with cricket and football reports and scores for use by newspapers. In its early years it covered other sports as well, including horse racing.

From Charles Pardon's becoming editor of Wisden Cricketers' Almanack in 1887, the editor was nearly always a CRA partner. The CRA was responsible for the editorial production of the Almanack, until in 1965 the agency merged with the PA.
