= Mei (surname) =

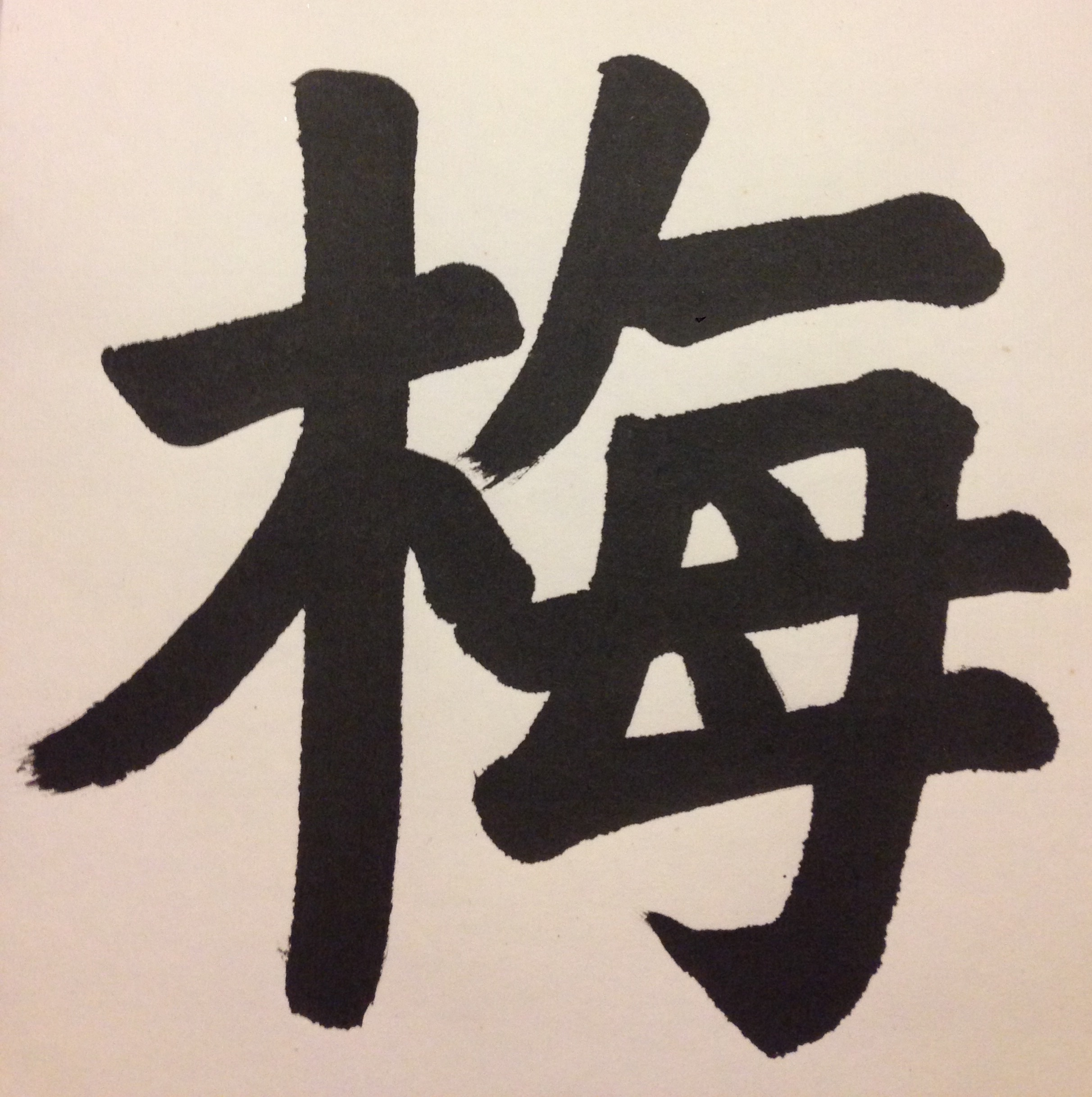
Chinese calligraphy of the character representing the surname "Méi."

Mei (Chinese: 梅; pinyin: Méi) is a romanized spelling of a Chinese surname, transcribed in the Mandarin dialect. In Hong Kong and other Cantonese-speaking regions, the name may be transliterated as Mui or Moy. In Vietnam, this surname is written as Mai. In romanized Korean, it is spelled Mae. The name literally translates in English to the plum fruit. The progenitor of the Méi clan, Méi Bo, originated from near a mountain in ancient China that was lined at its base with plum trees.

Mei is also an Italian surname, and one transcription of the Slavic surname also spelt Mey (Мей).

== Origins ==
The Méi clan came from the Zi (子) family. They were awarded a kingdom in the southeast of Bo County in Anhui called Mei kingdom. The Méi ancestral hometown is located 60 miles southeast of Runan county, Henan province in central China.

The first patriarch of the Méi lineage was Méi Bo or the Earl of Méi. During King Zhou's reign (Shang dynasty, 1766–1122 BCE), Méi Bo pleaded repeatedly to King Zhou to repent from his cruel and corrupt ways. Méi Bo's convictions angered the erratic ruler, which he viewed as insubordination. As punishment, the Earl of Méi was beheaded. Inspired by Méi Bo's acts, his descendants subsequently adopted the surname of Méi to pay homage to this ancient noble.

== People with the surname Mei (梅) ==
- Anita Mui, Hong Kong singer and actress
- Anna Kong Mei, Chinese-American clubwoman, writer
- James Mui, American musician of Puerto Rican and Chinese descent.
- Mei Ju-ao, jurist of the Tokyo Trial
- Mei Lanfang (1894–1961), Beijing opera actor
- Lexton Moy, American soccer player of Chinese and Filipino heritage
- Kenneth K. Mei (1932–2017), Chinese-American electrical engineer and academic
- Mei Lin (actress), Chinese actress
- Mei Quong Tart, Australian Chinese businessman
- Mai Thuc Loan, Vietnamese emperor
- Mei Yaochen, Song dynasty poet
- Moy Yat, Kung Fu master (Wing Chun)
- Jeannie Mai, Chinese-Vietnamese American television presenter, make-up artist, and stylist.
- Moi Meng Ling, Malaysian virologist

== People with the surname Mei (Italian) ==
- Andrea Mei (born 1989), Italian footballer
- Anna Mei (born 1967), Italian racing cyclist and mountain biker
- Bernardino Mei (1612/15–1676), Italian painter and engraver
- Giovanni Mei (born 1953), Italian retired footballer
- Girolamo Mei (1519–1594), Italian historian and humanist
- Nicola Mei (born 1985), Italian professional basketball player
- Paolo Mei (1831–1900), Italian painter
- Stefano Mei (born 1963), Italian long-distance runner

== People with the surname Mei/Mey (Мей) ==
- Kristine Mei (1895–1969), Estonian sculptor and book illustrator
- Lev Mei (1822–1862), Russian dramatist and poet
- Lydia Mei (1896–1965), Estonian artist
- Natalie Mei (1900–1975), Estonian painter and graphic artist
- Peeter Mei (1893–1941), Estonian military officer

== See also ==
- Roger Meï (1935–2025), French politician
- Mey (surname)
