= List of Estonian women artists =

This is a list of women artists born in Estonia or whose artworks are closely associated with that country.

== A ==
- Ellinor Aiki (1893–1969), painter

== H ==
- Epp Haabsaar (born 1953), painter, illustrator
- Julie Wilhelmine Hagen-Schwarz (1824–1902), Baltic-German painter

== I ==
- Inéz (active since mid-1990s), contemporary artist, musician, composer

== J ==
- Alisa Jakobi (born 1981), painter, actress, graphic designer

== K ==
- Elvy Kalep (1899–1989), pilot, painter, toy designer, writer
- Kalli Kalde (born 1967), graphic artist, illustrator
- Liis Koger (born 1989), painter, poet
- Meeli Kõiva (born 1960), painter, sculptor, glass designer

== M ==
- Kadri Mälk (born 1958–2023), painter, jewelry designer
- Eveline Adelheid von Maydell (1890–1962), silhouette artist
- Lydia Mei (1896–1965), painter
- Natalie Mei (1900–1975), painter, graphic artist

== N ==
- Katja Novitskova (born 1984), installation artist
- Mall Nukke (born 1964), painter, collage artist, installation artist

== P ==
- Birgit Püve (born 1978), photographer

== R ==
- Sirje Runge (born 1950), painter and designer

== S ==
- Viive Sterpu (1953–2012), artist, glass designer

== T ==
- Katrina Tang (born 1985), photographer
- Ann Tenno (born 1952), photographer
- Tio Tepandi (born 1947), theatre designer

== V ==
- Lüüdia Vallimäe-Mark (1925–2004), painter and printmaker
- Agaate Veeber (1901–1988), graphic artist
- Erna Viitol (1920–2001), sculptor

== W ==
- Ilon Wikland (born 1930), painter, illustrator
