= Lüüdia Vallimäe-Mark =

Estonian artist (1925–2004)

- Born: January 10, 1925; Tartu, Estonia
- Died: October 15, 2004 (aged 79); Tartu, Estonia
- Occupation: Artist
- Parents: Julius Mark (father); Kristine Mei (mother)
- Relatives: Karin Mark, Elga Mark-Kurik, Peeter Mei, Lydia Mei, Natalie Mei, Johan Mey

Lüüdia Vallimäe-Mark (until 1953 Mark; January 10, 1925 – October 15, 2004) was an Estonian artist.

== Early life and education ==
Lüüdia Vallimäe-Mark was born in Tartu, Estonia, one of four daughters of the linguist Julius Mark (1890–1959) and the sculptor Kristine Mei (1895–1969). She received her art education from 1943 to 1949 at the Pallas Art School and the Tartu State Art Institute.

== Career ==
After graduating, Vallimäe-Mark started working as a laboratory assistant at the University of Tartu. From 1952 to 1954, she worked at the Tartu Workshop of the Art Foundation, and from 1953 to 1973 she was a non-staff artist at the Estonian State Publishing House. Vallimäe-Mark interacted closely with her fellow students, in a group that included Ülo Sooster. She was part of the unofficial 1960s group that significantly renewed Estonian art, which presented their creations based on modernist artistic language at the Tartu 8th Secondary School exhibition.

== Work ==
Vallimäe-Mark's work primarily consists of portraits. She also painted nudes and landscapes, figural compositions, cityscapes, and, in her later creative period, abstract works and paintings with surrealist overtones. Critics have drawn parallels to the color harmony and technical virtuosity of Renaissance artists when describing her painting style. Her sensitive sense of color and subtlety of painting were appreciated. Her earlier works are characterized by a realistic approach and fine brushwork. Starting in the mid-1950s, her paintings became more decorative, with a strong drawing element and nuanced coloring.

A prominent part of Vallimäe-Mark's work is made up of illustrations for children's books, which also reveal the artist's lyrical worldview and rich use of color: her illustrations for the Brothers Grimm's Frau Holle, Ellen Niit's Midrimaa (Wonderland), Friedrich Reinhold Kreutzwald's Kullaketrajad (The Gold-Spinners), and Juhan Kunder's Suur Peeter ja Väike Peeter (Big Peter and Little Peter) have been familiar to several generations of children.

Vallimäe-Mark began exhibiting at exhibitions in 1956, and she held solo exhibitions at the Tartu Art Museum in 1976 and 1985, and at Tartu's Küü Gallery in 1993 and 1995.

Vallimäe-Mark became a member of the Estonian Artists' Association in 1957. She was a member of the Pallas art association.

== Family ==
Vallimäe-Mark's maternal aunts were the artists Natalie Mei and Lydia Mei. Her sister Elga Mark-Kurik was a well-known paleontologist. She was the granddaughter of the navigator and hydrographer Johan Mey.
