= Elga Mark-Kurik =

Estonian geologist and paleontologist

- Born: December 26, 1928; Tartu, Estonia
- Died: November 6, 2016 (aged 87)
- Occupations: Geologist and paleontologist
- Parents: Julius Mark (father); Kristine Mei (mother)
- Relatives: Karin Mark, Lüüdia Vallimäe-Mark, Peeter Mei, Lydia Mei, Natalie Mei, Johan Mey

Elga Mark-Kurik (before 1964 Elga Mark; 26 December 1928 Tartu – 6 November 2016) was an Estonian geologist and paleontologist. With over 130 articles published, Mark-Kurik is particularly known for the discovery of Livoniana, a fossil sometimes described as "missing link" between fish and tetrapods.

== Biography ==
Elga Mark was born on 26 December 1928 in Tartu, Estonia. Her father, Julius Mark, was vice-president of the Estonian Academy of Sciences and a professor of Finno-Ugric languages at the University of Tartu. Her mother and sister were artists, daughters of the navigator and hydrographer Johan Mey. The family was threatened with deportation by the KGB in 1941.

In 1947 she began her degree, graduating in 1952 with a degree in Geology from the University of Tartu, before pivoting her studies to paleoichthyology where she produced her 1955 dissertation: ‘Devonian psammosteids (Agnatha) of the Tartu and Gauja Stages in Estonian SSR'. During this time she described new discoveries of Holonema.

She went on to work as a researcher for the Estonian Academy of Sciences followed by a long career of approximately 64 years in the Department of Geology at Tallinn University. This included roles as a senior scientist in 1989 and a lead scientist in 1992. For some periods, due to economic pressures she took lower paid roles to maintain her research and voluntarily mentored students at Tartu University including Tiiu Märss.

She married in 1964 to Robert Kurik and they had two children together: Simo and Maie.

== Works ==
Mark-Kurik published over 130 articles during the course of her life, primarily focused on paleoichthyology. Her particular interest included turtles and crustaceans in the third and fourth periods of the Paleozoic Era (the Silurian and Devonian periods) though she is also known for works in biogeography, taxonomy, morphology, evolution and biostratigraphy. She became one of the first female paleoartists in Soviet Union.

In 1964, she discovered the jawbone of Livoniana multidentata, a 375 million year old fossil which is considered the "missing link" between fish and tetrapods. Although she published her findings at the time, the Soviet regime required scientific research to be published in Russian, and so it was missed by Western sources. After the fall of the Soviet Union, the fossil resurfaced as part of a project Mark-Kurik was working on, comparing fossils between Scotland and the Baltics.
