= Ambla Cemetery =

Cemetery in Ambla, Estonia

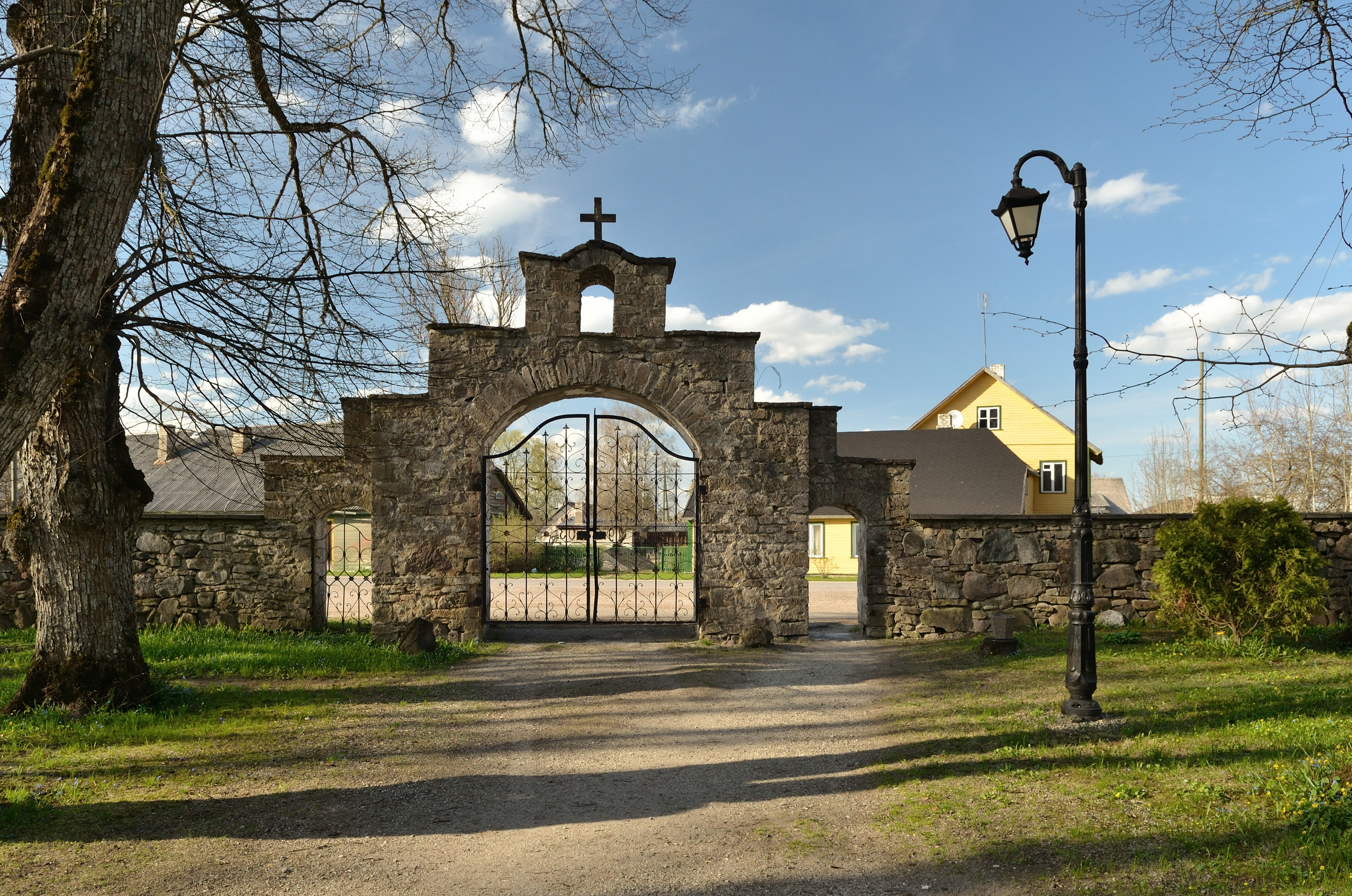
- Ambla Cemetery gate
- Interactive map of Ambla Cemetery

Details
- Location: Ambla
- Country: Estonia
- Coordinates: 59°11′28″N 25°50′23″E
- Size: 3.30 ha (8.2 acres)

Ambla Cemetery (Estonian: Ambla kalmistu), also Ambla Churchyard (Estonian: Ambla kirkuaed), is a cemetery in the town of Ambla in Järva County, Estonia. The cemetery is located at Light Street 2 (Valguse tee 2). It surrounds Ambla Church.

== Memorials ==
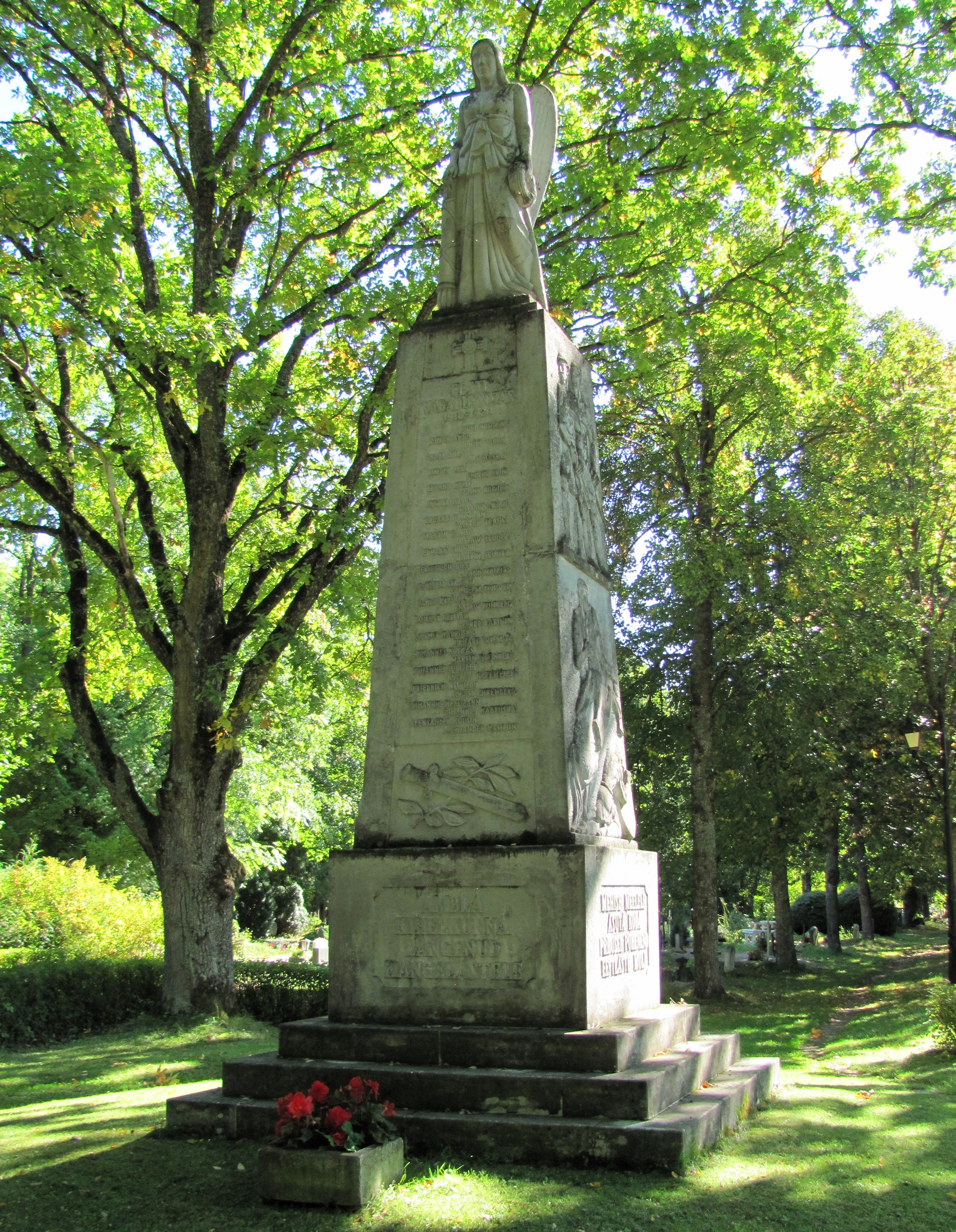
Ambla War of Independence Monument

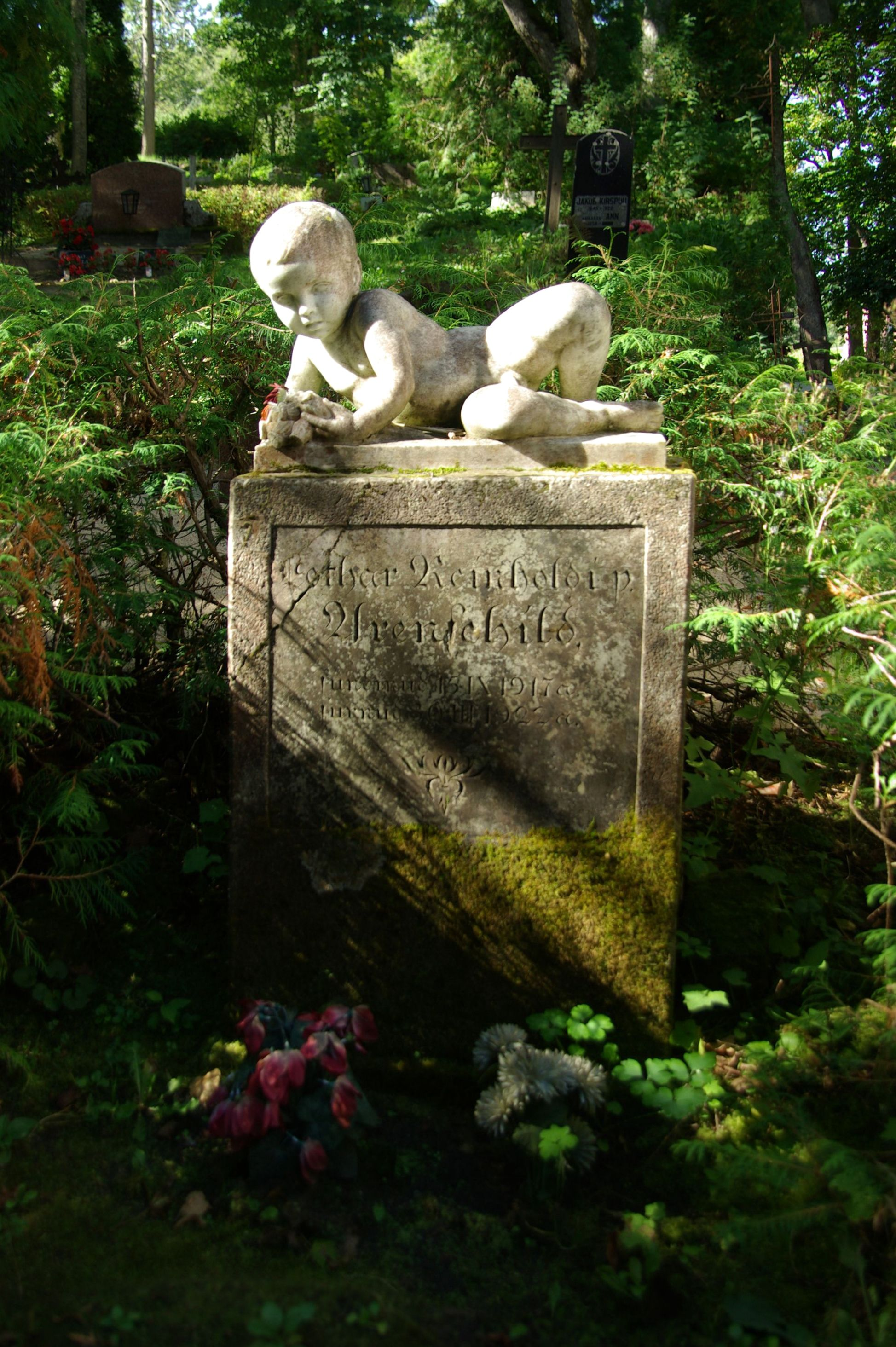
Poiss moonidega (Boy with Poppies)

The following memorials are located in Ambla Cemetery:

- The Ambla War of Independence Monument, created by Anton Starkopf
- Poiss moonidega (Boy with Poppies), created by Anton Starkopf for the grave of Lothar Arenschild (1917–1922)

== Notable burials ==
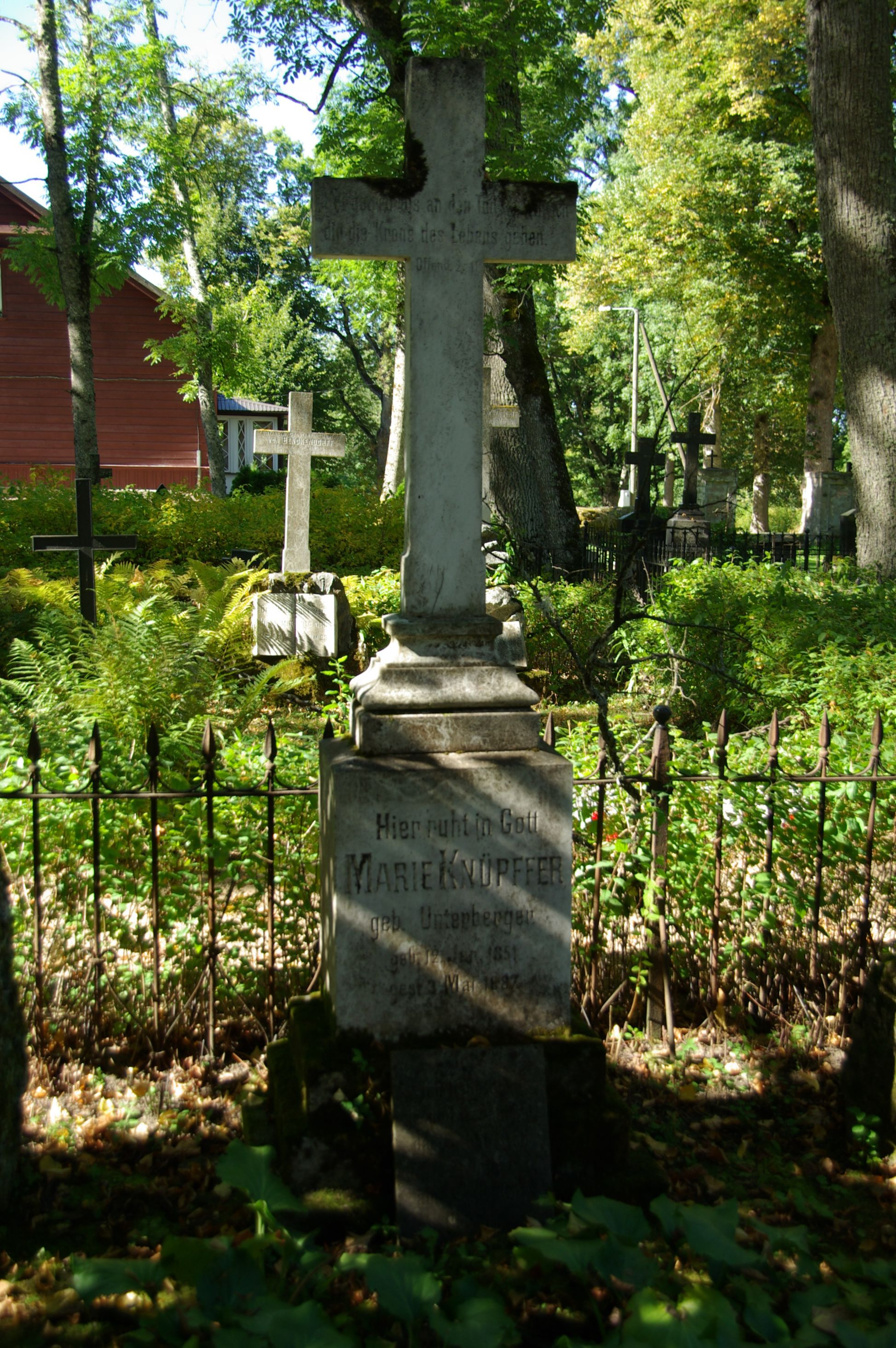
Grave of Marie Knüpffer (1851–1887)

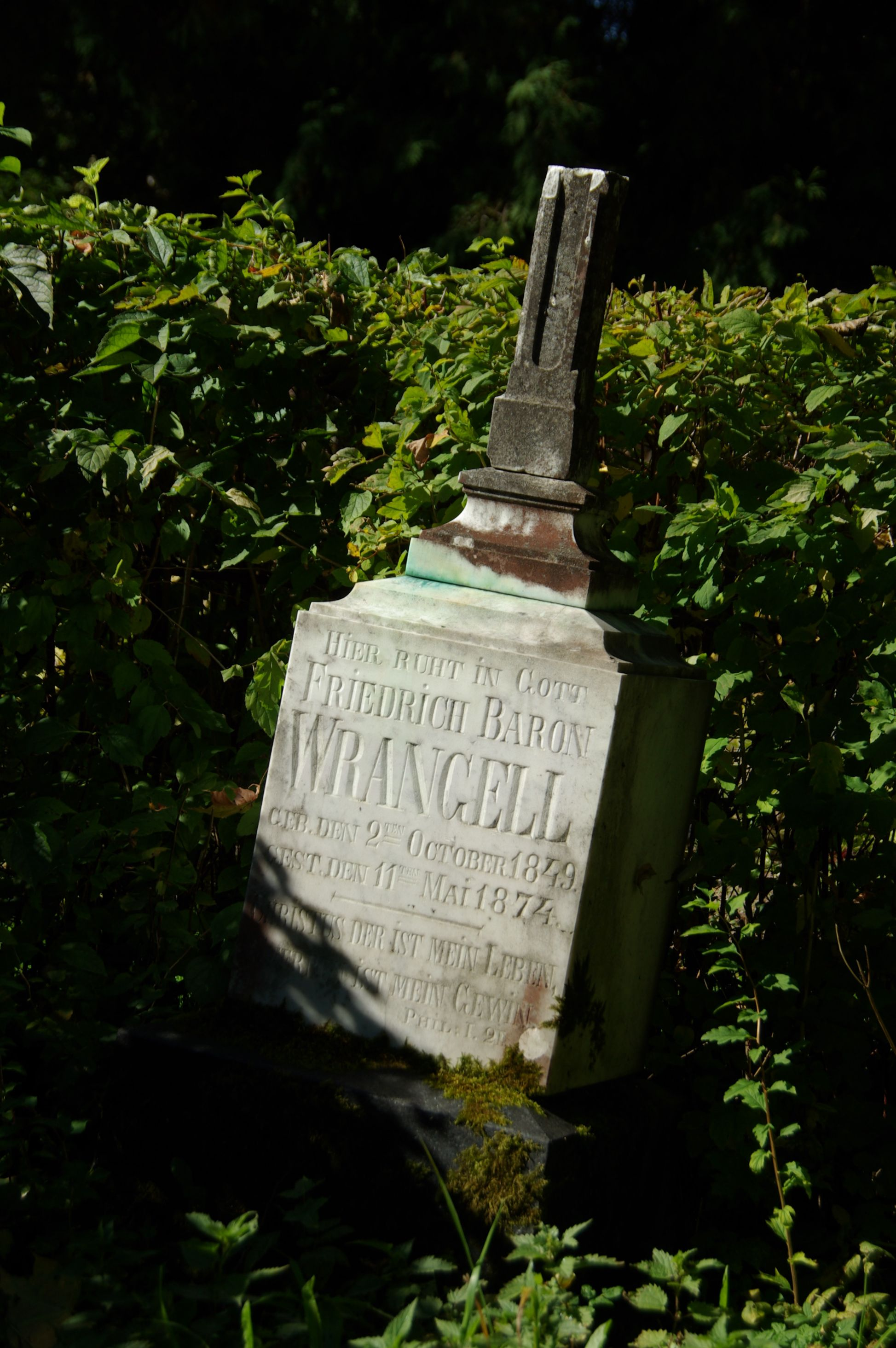
Grave of Baron Friedrich Wrangell (1849–1874)

The following persons are buried in the cemetery:

- Friedrich von Hoyningen-Huene (1843–1921), lepidopterist
- Jakob Kents (1883–1947), geographer
- Marie Knüpffer (1851–1887), wife of Georg Knüpffer, pastor of Saint Mary's Parish of Ambla (1877–1891)
- Teet Lunts (1902–1941), naturalist
- Karl Gustav von Maydell (1788–1857), owner of Kuru Manor and member of the House of Maydell
- Marie Julianne von Maydell (1794–1874), member of the House of Maydell
- Mathilde Marie Elisabeth von Maydell (1826–1896), member of the House of Maydell
- Baron Friedrich Wrangell (1849–1874), Russian naval lieutenant
