= Starkopf =

Starkopf is a German surname. Notable people with the surname include:

- Anton Starkopf (1889–1966), Estonian sculptor
- Hannes Starkopf (1965–2021), Estonian sculptor
