= Kristine Mei =

Estonian artist (1895–1969)

- Born: January 13, 1895; Liepāja, Latvia
- Died: December 22, 1969 (aged 74)
- Resting place: Rahumäe Cemetery
- Occupations: Sculptor; book illustrator
- Spouse: Julius Mark
- Children: Lüüdia Vallimäe-Mark, Elga Mark-Kurik
- Father: Johan Mey
- Relatives: Peeter Mei, Lydia Mei, Natalie Mei

Kristine Mei (a.k.a. Christine Hildegard Mey; from 1921 to 1941 Mark-Mei; January 13, 1895 – December 22, 1969) was an Estonian sculptor and book illustrator.

== Early life and education ==
Kristine Mei was born in Liepāja, Latvia, to the hydrographer Johan Mey (1867–1927) and Marie (Mari, Marri) Mey, née Oengo (1873–1941). Her father was the head of dredging work at the Alexander III Military Port in Liepāja. She studied at Liepāja Girls' Secondary School from 1905 to 1912, at Tallinn Girls' Secondary School from 1913 to 1916, and at the Finnish Art Association's Ateneum Drawing School in Helsinki from 1913 to 1916, graduating in sculpture as a student of Viktor Malmberg. From 1916 to 1917 she studied at the Tallinn School of Art and Design.

== Career ==
Mei worked as a teacher at Elfriede Lender High School from 1918 to 1921, while at the same time serving as an official in the art department of the Ministry of Education (1919–1920). From 1922 to 1924, she worked at the Pallas Art School and at the Tartu Preschool Teachers School. She also taught art at the State Industrial Art School in Tallinn and Tallinn Technical College. After World War II, she worked at the University of Tartu Archaeological Museum from 1941 to 1947 and at the Institute of History of the Academy of Sciences from 1947 to 1954.

== Works ==
As a sculptor, Mei began her work with caricatured portrait statues of Estonian artists and writers. Her work mainly consisted of small sculptures in terracotta and, to a lesser extent, maiolica. Most of her works were destroyed in World War II, and the few surviving fragments are humorous small figures.

Mei was also a recognized designer of ceremonial certificates. Her creations included, for example, the certificate sent by the University of Tartu to the University of Padua for the anniversary of its founding (1922). Kristine Mei designed books, translated children's literature from Norwegian and Swedish, and wrote and illustrated children's stories herself.

== Family ==
Kristine Mei's brother was the military officer Peeter Mei (1893–1941), her sisters were the artists Lydia Mei (1896–1965) and Natalie Mei (1900–1975), and her brother-in-law was the sculptor Anton Starkopf (1889–1966). She was married to the linguist Julius Mark (1890–1959) from 1921 to 1941, and they had four daughters: the anthropologist Karin Julia Mark (1922–1999), the artist Lüüdia Vallimäe-Mark (1925–2004), the zootechnician Aino Ilona Lehtmets (née Mark, 1927–2011), and the geologist and paleontologist Elga Mark-Kurik (1928–2016).
