= Poiss moonidega =

Sculpture by Anton Starkopf

Coordinates: 59°11′28″N 25°50′23″E

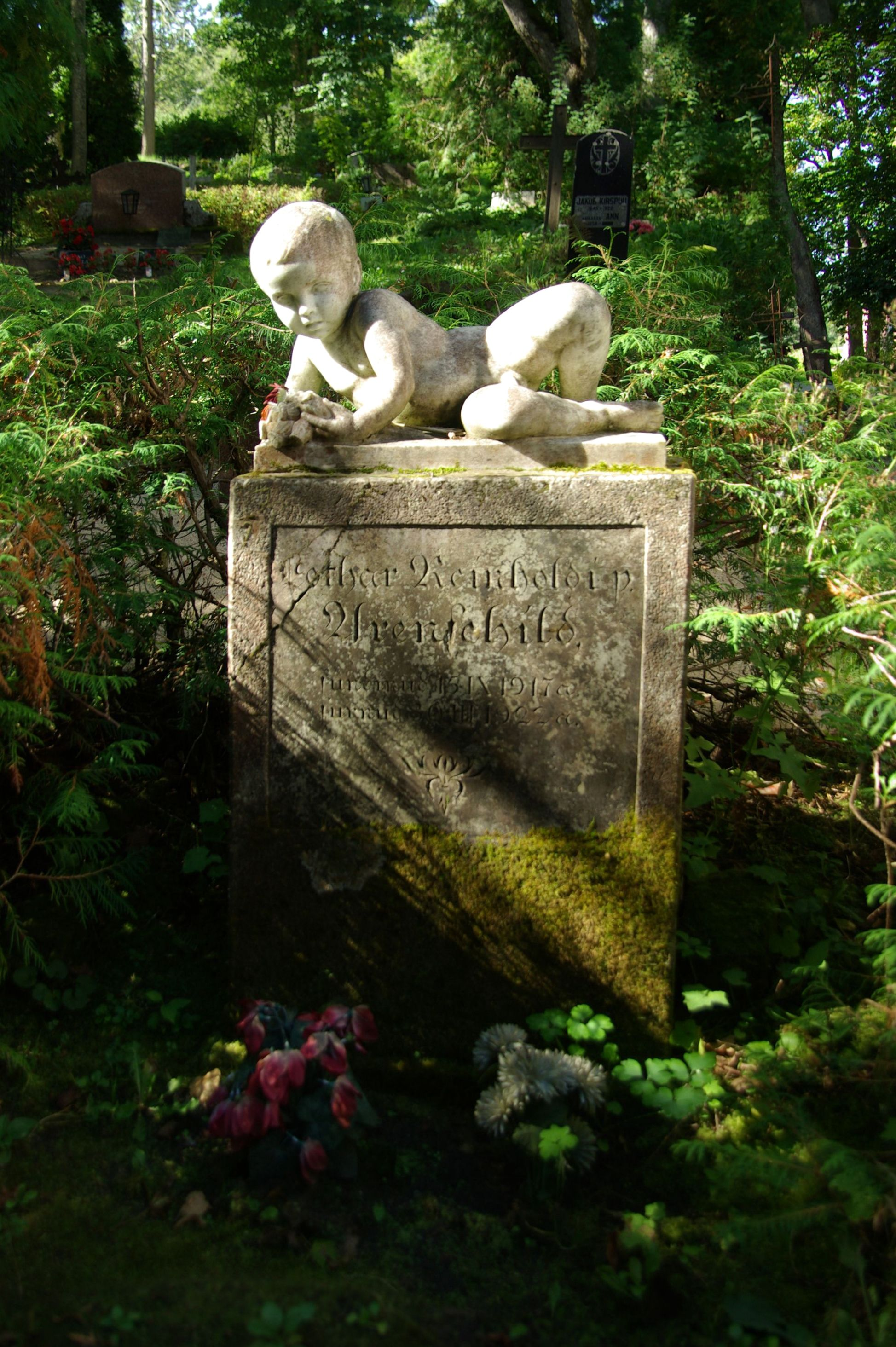
- Anton Starkopf's Poiss moonidega (Boy with Poppies)
- Artist: Anton Starkopf
- Year: 1923; 102 years ago
- Medium: Marble
- Dimensions: 38 cm × 27 cm × 57 cm (15 in × 11 in × 22 in)
- Location: Ambla, Estonia

Poiss moonidega (Boy with Poppies) is a marble tomb monument on the square behind the chapel in Ambla Cemetery in Ambla, Estonia. It was created in 1923 by the sculptor Anton Starkopf.

== History ==
The monument marks the grave of Lothar Arenschild (September 15, 1917 – March 30, 1922), the son of Reinhold Arenschild (also spelled Ahrenschild, 1884 – c. 1938) and Magdalena Arenschild (née Soosõrv, 1895–1945).

This was Starkopf's first tombstone, and it was commissioned by Reinhold Arenschild, the Ambla parish clerk, in memory of his son. Because the client was short of money, the statue was initially supposed to be made of cement. However, while on vacation in Germany, Starkopf met the Dresden sculptor Hans Hartmann-McLean, who was no longer working at the time. His studio was vacant and there was a piece of expensive marble there, and an assistant was also available. Therefore, Starkopf decided to model the intended tombstone figure and carve it in marble in Germany, from where it was later sent to Estonia.

In 1981, the upper left corner of the monument's plinth broke off and cracks developed in the plinth. After that a repair, slightly misaligned, was made to the monument. In 2021, the monument was removed for professional cleaning and repair. The restored monument was reinstalled in 2022.

An urban legend says that Lothar Arenschild was the son of a baker or pharmacist, and that he died after eating too many raw poppy seeds.

== Description ==
The marble sculpture depicts a reclining nude of a boy leaning on his right elbow. The boy holds a bouquet of poppies in his hands. Poppies were used by Starkopf as a symbol of transience. The front of the simple plinth is carved with Arenschild's birth and death dates.
