= Ambla War of Independence Monument =

Sculpture by Anton Starkopf

Coordinates: 59°11′26″N 25°50′25″E

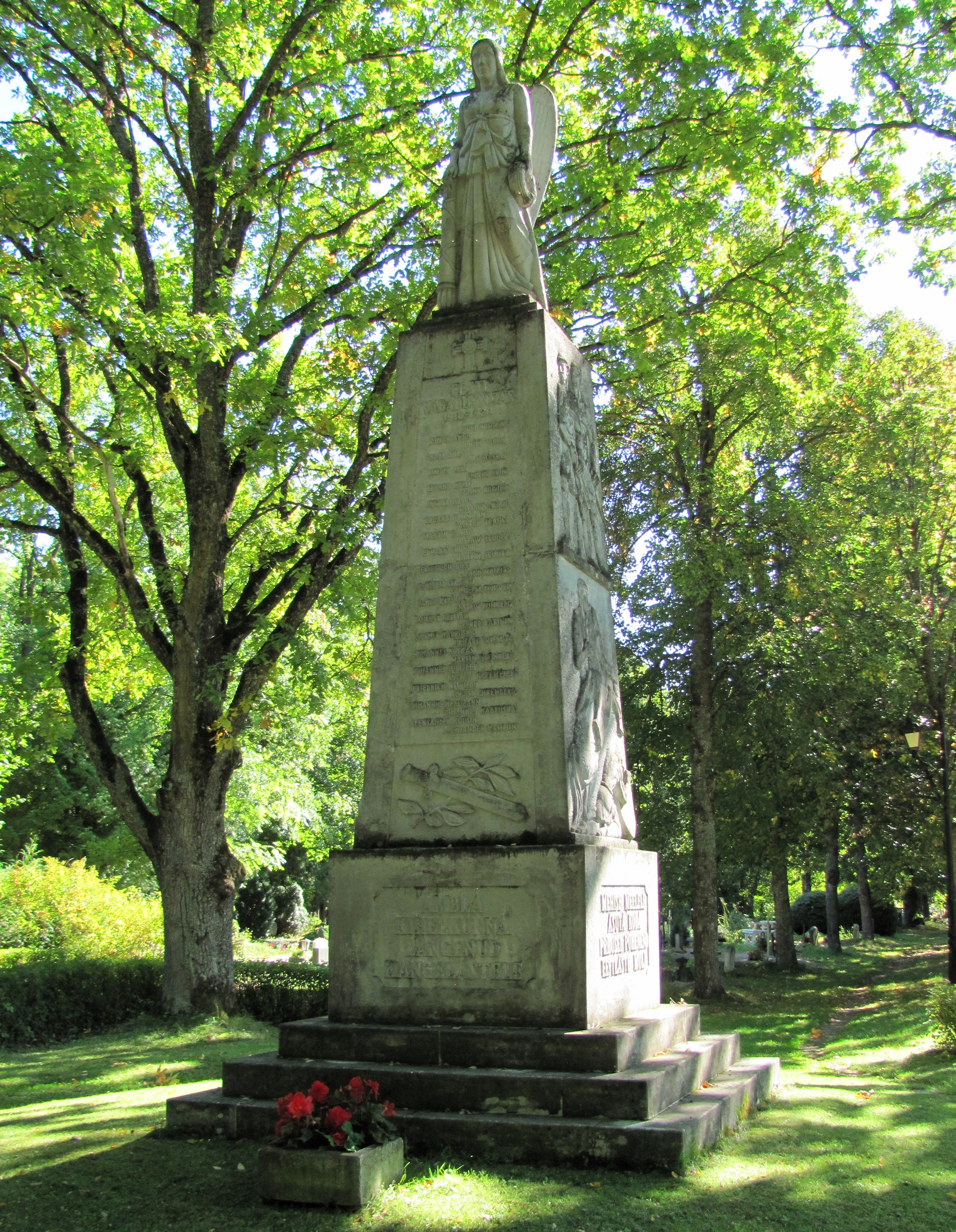
- Artist: Anton Starkopf
- Year: 1925; 101 years ago
- Medium: Limestone

The Ambla War of Independence Monument (Estonian: Ambla Vabadussõja mälestussammas) is a monument in Ambla Cemetery in Ambla, Estonia. It is dedicated to the soldiers from Ambla Parish that fell in the First World War and the Estonian War of Independence. The memorial was first unveiled in 1925.

== History ==
The designs for the memorial to the soldiers from Ambla Parish that fell in the First World War and the War of Independence were created by the sculptor Anton Starkopf. The memorial was carved from limestone and unveiled on September 27, 1925. The monument was dismantled in October 1949 during the Soviet occupation of Estonia; the pieces were taken to the Ambla River, and the angel statue was thrown into the Soodla River.

Working drawings for a replica of the monument were prepared by the architect Allan Murdmaa. The stonework was created by the sculptor Hannes Starkopf and the Dolokivi company under the leadership of Volli Sai. The replica monument was unveiled on June 23, 1990.

On August 24, 2023, pieces of the original monument were discovered during the relocation of Soviet mass graves in the Ambla and Järva-Madise areas, where they had been used as the foundation for a Soviet monument. The pieces are planned to be exhibited in the Ambla Parish park.

== Description ==
The column is an exact copy of the original. The monument is an obelisk standing on three steps and a cube-shaped base, with an angel statue at the top. At the top of the front of the column is a relief image of the Cross of Liberty and the text Eesti Vabadussõjas 1918–1920 (Estonian War of Independence 1918–1920). The names of the 42 fallen soldiers follow, with a relief sword and laurel branch below. The plinth below has the text Ambla kihelkonna langenud kangelastele (Ambla Parish, to the fallen heroes).

At the top of the back of the obelisk is a Cross of St. George and the text Ilmasõjas 1914–1918 (Air War 1914–1918) and the names of the 132 fallen, with a relief sword and a laurel branch below it. The plinth has the text Tõesti ütleb vaim, et nemad peavad hingama omast vaevast ja nende teod käivad ka nende järele (Truly the Spirit says that they may rest from their labors and their works do follow them), quoting Revelation 14:13.

On the left side of the obelisk there are two bas-reliefs. The upper one depicts a woman (a mother) sending a man (her son) off to war, shaking hands with her loved one for the last time. The lower panel depicts a soldier that has brought his fallen comrade home to his widow. The lower plinth has the inscription Ilus on surra isamaa eest (It is beautiful to die for one's country).

The right side of the obelisk depicts two battle scenes. The upper one shows two soldiers holding their swords and entering battle shoulder to shoulder. The lower panel depicts a horseman and a wounded soldier leaning on a shield. The text on the plinth reads Mehise meelele asuta koda, priiusel pühenend eestlaste muld (Build a home for the manly mind, consecrate the Estonian soil to freedom), a quote from Lydia Koidula's poem "Teretus" (Greeting).

All the texts on the pillar are carved in relief letters. The angel and the relief figures are clothed in Roman robes. At the top of the column is a three-step staircase, at the top of which is a standing angel figure 1.83 meters (6 ft 0 in) tall carved from stone: a symbol of peace. In its lowered right hand, it holds a burning torch, and in its left hand a laurel wreath given to the victors.
