= Sääre, Hiiu County =

Village in Estonia

Sääre
- Village
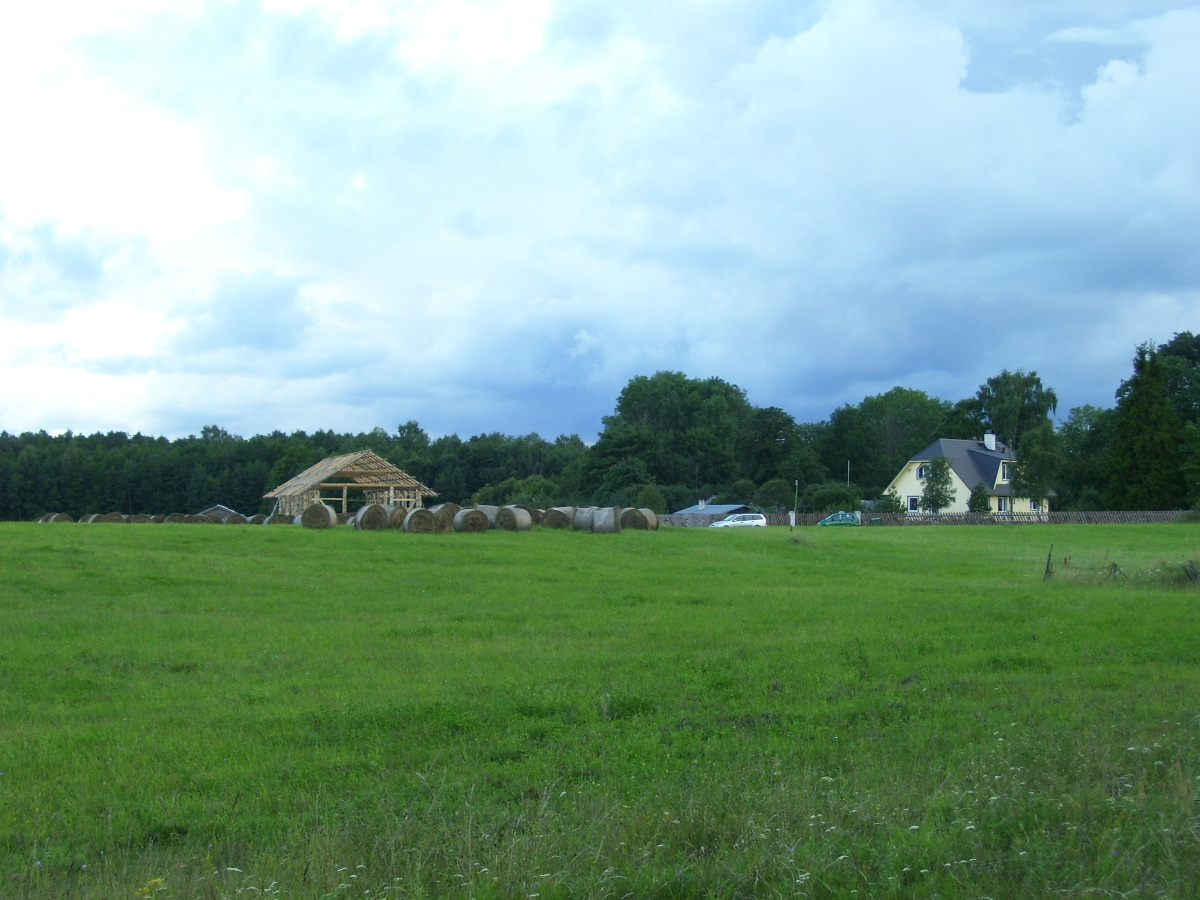
- The Nuudi farm in Sääre

- Location within Estonia
- Coordinates: 58°57′42″N 22°54′56″E
- Country: Estonia
- County: Hiiu County
- Parish: Hiiumaa Parish
- Time zone: UTC+2 (EET)
  - Summer (DST): UTC+3 (EEST)

Sääre is a village in Hiiumaa Parish, Hiiu County, in northwestern Estonia.

== Name ==
Sääre was attested in historical sources as Särle by in 1565, Sehrell in 1726, and Säre in 1798. The name means 'headland' (a metaphorical extension of säär 'leg', genitive sääre), and the village is located where the Sääre Spit (Estonian: Sääre nina) extends from the island of Hiiumaa.

== Notable people ==
Notable people that were born or lived in Sääre include the following:

- Johan Mey (1867–1927), navigator and hydrographer
