= Johan Mey =

Estonian navigator and hydrographer (1867–1927)

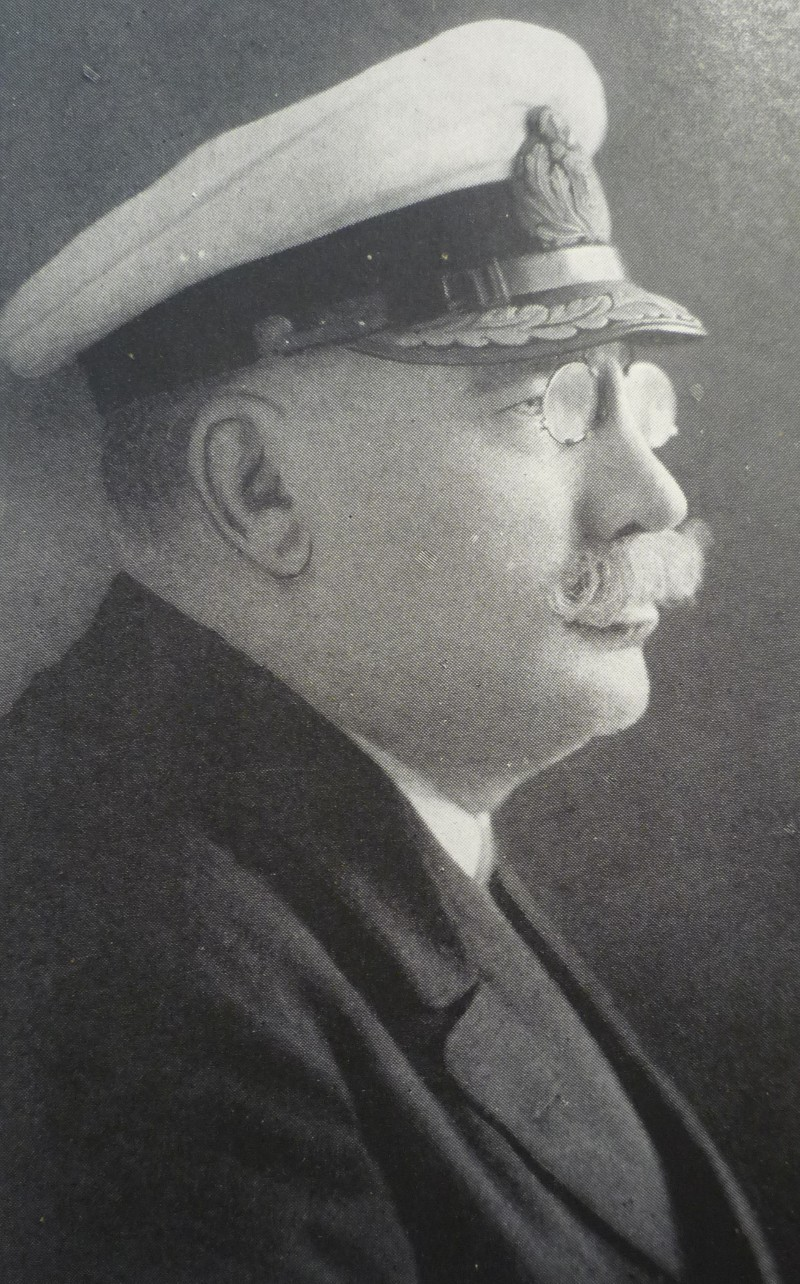
- Born: November 19, 1867; Sääre, Governorate of Estonia, Russian Empire
- Died: April 5, 1927 (aged 59); Tallinn, Estonia
- Resting place: Rahumäe Cemetery
- Occupations: Navigator and hydrographer
- Children: Peeter Mei, Kristine Mei, Lydia Mei, Natalie Mei
- Relatives: Lüüdia Vallimäe-Mark, Elga Mark-Kurik (granddaughters)

Johan Mey (also Johann Mey, Juhan Mei; November 19, 1867 – April 5, 1927) was an Estonian navigator, hydrographer, surveyor, and military officer (a lieutenant colonel).

== Early life and education ==
Johan Mey came from a family of seafarers from Hiiumaa, where he was born in the village of Sääre to Madis Mei (or Mey; 1837–1920) and Marie Mei (née Kimber, 1840–1924). He developed an early interest in shipping and maritime affairs, and he joined a merchant ship at age 16. He studied for a few years at the Tallinn District School, and later at the Paldiski Martifime School and Liepāja Maritime School, becoming a long-distance helmsman.

In his youth, Mey collected oral folklore by transcribing folk songs. Much of his material can be found in Jakob Hurt's collection.

== Career ==
In 1892, Mey was appointed a captain for ship construction at the Riga Military Port, and then he became interested in port construction and dredging. In 1897, he passed the officer's examination at the St. Petersburg Naval Cadet Corps. He was then enrolled in the reserve army as an ensign.

At the outbreak of the Russo-Japanese War, Mey was called up for active service, appointed watch officer on the steamer Chaika, and also made head of dredging work at the Liepāja Military Port. In 1906, Mey supervised the hydrographic and dredging work in the Soela Strait. From 1908 to the fall of 1917, he supervised the same work at the new Tallinn Military Port (Miinisadam). During the same period, he also worked in the Finnish Straits; the work resulted in new fairways in Barösund and Barösund-Ekenäs, and several dredged shipping lanes near Porkkala.

In 1914, Mey was sent to Germany, the Netherlands, and England to study modern port construction. In 1916, Mey took part in dredging the large strategic Kumari Channel in the Sea of Straits. He was one of the top specialists in Russia. He was awarded the Order of Saint Stanislaus second and third class, the Order of Saint Anna third class, and a large gold medal.

In 1917, Mey was evacuated to St. Petersburg. From there, he chose to return to Estonia in 1920. In Estonia, Mey worked as a senior commanding officer in the Naval Forces Command Staff, and a few months later as commander of the minesweeper division. He remained there until the division was liquidated. On March 15, 1921, Johan Mey was assigned to the Fourth Department of the General Staff (the topo-hydrography department) as a cartographer. From 1921 to 1926, Mey mainly carried out measurements of Estonian ports, and he also compiled and edited publications for the topo-hydrography department.

Mey published various articles on maritime and shipping in the press; these articles were also translated and published in foreign magazines. In 1925, Mey began compiling the navigation manual Eesti loots (Estonian Pilot), which was completed by the spring of 1927. It was the first Estonian-language book in this field.

Mey died of heart disease a few days after the printing of Eesti loots at the Tallinn Military Hospital, and he was buried at Rahumäe Cemetery in Tallinn.

== Works ==
- 1924: (with Paul-Leopold Oengo, Gustav Johannes Juks, et al.) Eesti merikaartide kokkuseadmise ja väljatöötamise kord (The Procedure for Compiling and Developing Estonian Nautical Charts). Tallinn.
- 1924: Lühike ajaloolik ülevaade hüdrograafilisest meremõõtmisest Eestis ja mis sel alal Eesti Iseseisvuse ajal tehtud (A Brief Historical Overview of Hydrographic Marine Surveying in Estonia and What Was Done in This Area during Estonian Independence). Tallinn.
- 1925: Inglise-eesti meresõnastik: merekaartide ja lootsiraamatute juure (English–Estonian Nautical Dictionary: The Basics of Nautical Charts and Pilot Books). Tallinn.
- 1925: Eesti rannik ja meri. Eesti loodus (The Estonian Coast and Sea. Estonian Nature). Tallinn.
- 1926: Peipsi, Lämmi ja Pihkva järve ranniku ja vete topograafiline kirjeldus (Topographic Description of the Coast and Waters of Lake Peipus, Warm Lake, and Lake Pskov). Tallinn.
- 1927: Eesti loots. Meresõidu ja lootsiasjanduse käsiraamat. Hüdrograafiline kirjeldus Eesti rannikust ja merest (Estonian Pilot. Handbook of Seafaring and Pilotage. A Hydrographic Description of the Estonian Coast and Sea). Tallinn.

== Family ==
Johan Mey married Marie (Mari, Marri) Oengo (1873–1941), and they had five children. Their son Peter Friedrich Eustachius Mey (later Peeter Mei, 1893–1941) was a senior lieutenant and artillery officer of the Technical Department of the Naval Staff, and he died at the Ivdellag gulag in Russia. Among their daughters, Kristine Mei (1895–1969) was a sculptor and book illustrator, Lydia Mei (1896–1965) was a watercolorist, and Natalie Mei (1900–1975) was a painter and graphic artist. Another daughter, Helene (Leena) Mei (1898–1926), died of tuberculosis at a young age.
