= Ann Tenno =

Estonian photographer and photo artist

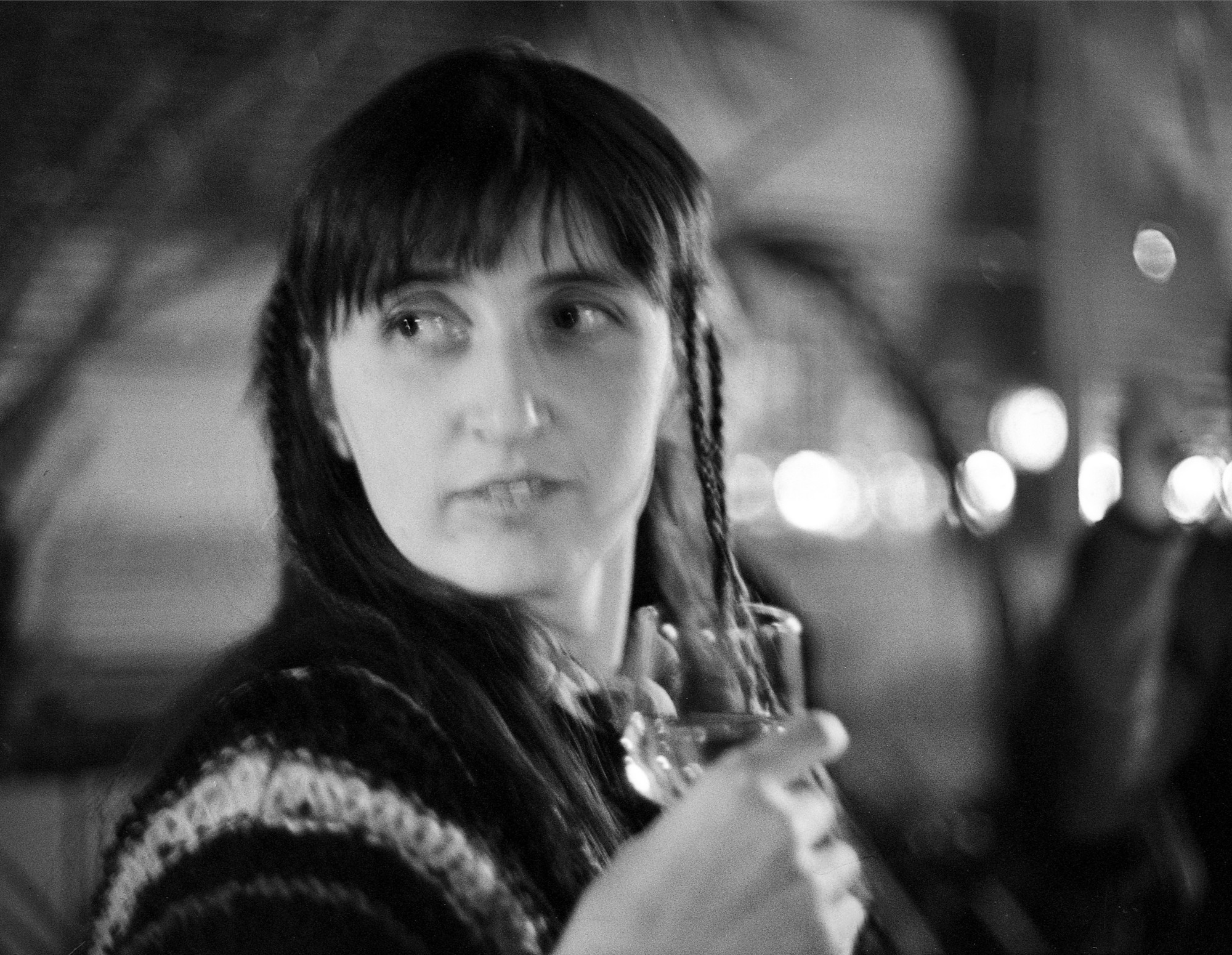
Ann Tenno in 1985

Ann Tenno (née Ann Epler; born 4 December 1952) is an Estonian photographer and photo artist. Lonely Planet states that "some of the most spectacular and sensitive photographs of Estonia have been taken by Ann Tenno and published in books which best capture the spirit of Estonian nature." She is noted in particular for her town landscapes, especially photographs of the Estonian capital of Tallinn, and the churches and manor houses of Estonia.

== Early life ==
Ann Tenno was born in Tartu. She graduated from Tartu Secondary School No. 5. in 1971. In 1976, she graduated with a degree in algebra from the Faculty of Mathematics at the University of Tartu. She then worked in the field of mathematics in the Economic Department of the University of Tartu and Department of Mathematics of the Tallinn University of Technology until 1984, when she began working at the Design Institute of Cultural Monuments as a photographer.

== Career ==
"Like all cities, Tallinn is not only composed of the medieval buildings and narrow, intertwining streets of the Old Town, nor the outer-lying newly built suburbs. Without people, events and thoughts and without the life that a weekend tourist can hardly begin to experience, the city does not exist for me.

One book can not, in detail, describe Tallinn. So you will find in my pictures only a part of this intricate and multi-faceted city. You will find the aspects of the city which have charmed me most, and those moments when light and colour fuse into something attractive and extraordinary, in places and in views which are otherwise so familiar. You will find in this book that certain character of Tallinn which explains why I love this windy, coastal city."

—Ann Tenno on her allurance to photographing the Estonian capital

Ann Tenno has worked as a freelance photographer, and her images have been compiled and published in numerous books of other authors. Her photo exhibitions were mainly in the 1980s, and she has since published numerous photographic books which have been warmly received by critics. In 1998 she published a book of photographs of the Estonian capital of Tallinn, and in 2002 she published a book of photographs on the churches of Estonia. The Baltic Times praised the photographs, saying that they "fill the airy room with exotic sights". She is also the co-author with Juhan Maiste of Manor Houses of Estonia. This book received considerable acclaim and was cited by City paper: the Baltic States as "the most beautiful book on Estonian manors". The Baltic Review cited her as a "well known" photographer of Estonia whose works provide "a genuine depiction of life in contemporary Estonia." Ann Tenno's works are in the collections of the San Francisco Museum of Modern Art (SFMOMA) and the Museum of Contemporary Photography (MoCP) in Chicago.

== Selected books ==
- Tallinn (1992)
- Leben Danach (1994)
- Eestimaa pildid (1996)
- Läbi aegade (1997)
- Highway USA (1998)
- Tallinna album (1998)
- Eestimaa saared ja rannad (1999)
- Inglismaa aiad (2000)
- Pärnu (2001)
- Eestimaa kirikud with Jüri Kuuskemaa (2002)
- Jaapan. Aiad (2002)
- Eestimaa (2005)
- Tallinn (2005)
- Üle unepiiri (2010)
- Eesti. Estonian Landscapes (2016)
- Where Shooting Stars Land, Audiobook (2022)
