= Erna Viitol =

Estonian sculptor

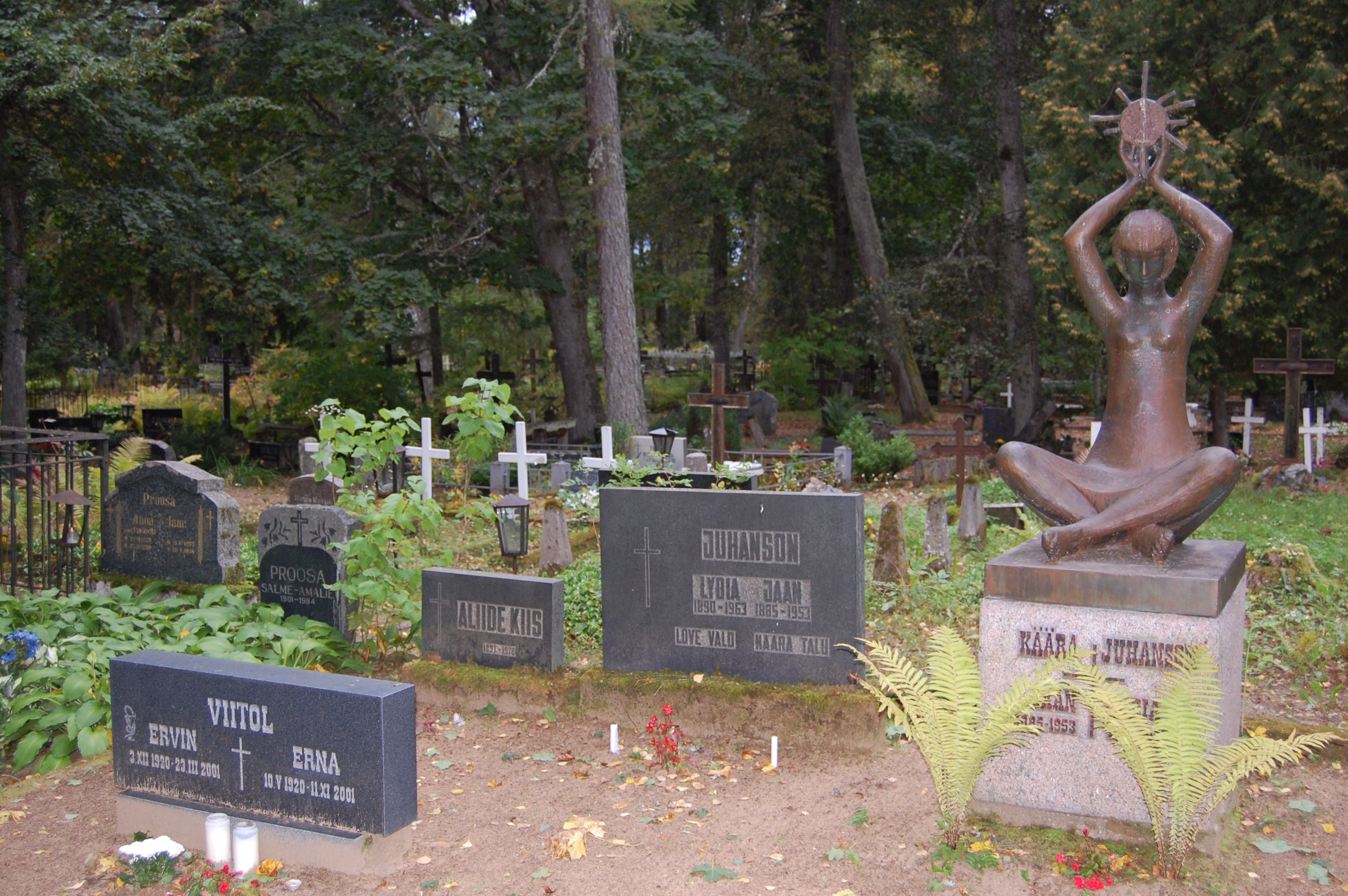
Grave of Erna Viitol (lower left side of image) at the Helme Cemetery in Helme Parish, Valga County

Erna Viitol (née Erna Juhanson; 10 May 1920 – 11 November 2001) was an Estonian sculptor.

== Biography ==
Viitol was born into a family of farmers in Ala, Lõve Parish (now in Tõrva Parish), Valga County. She traveled to Stockholm, Sweden to study. Upon her return to Estonia in 1943, she studied in Tallinn at the Tallinn School of Applied and Fine Arts.

== Works ==
Viitol's sculptures, among others, included a bronze bust of female Estonian literary writer, Ellen Niit, and portraits of Heino Kiik, Lilli Promet, and Aino Kallas.
