= Türi War of Independence Monument =

Sculpture by Anton Starkopf

Coordinates: 58°48′35″N 25°25′37″E

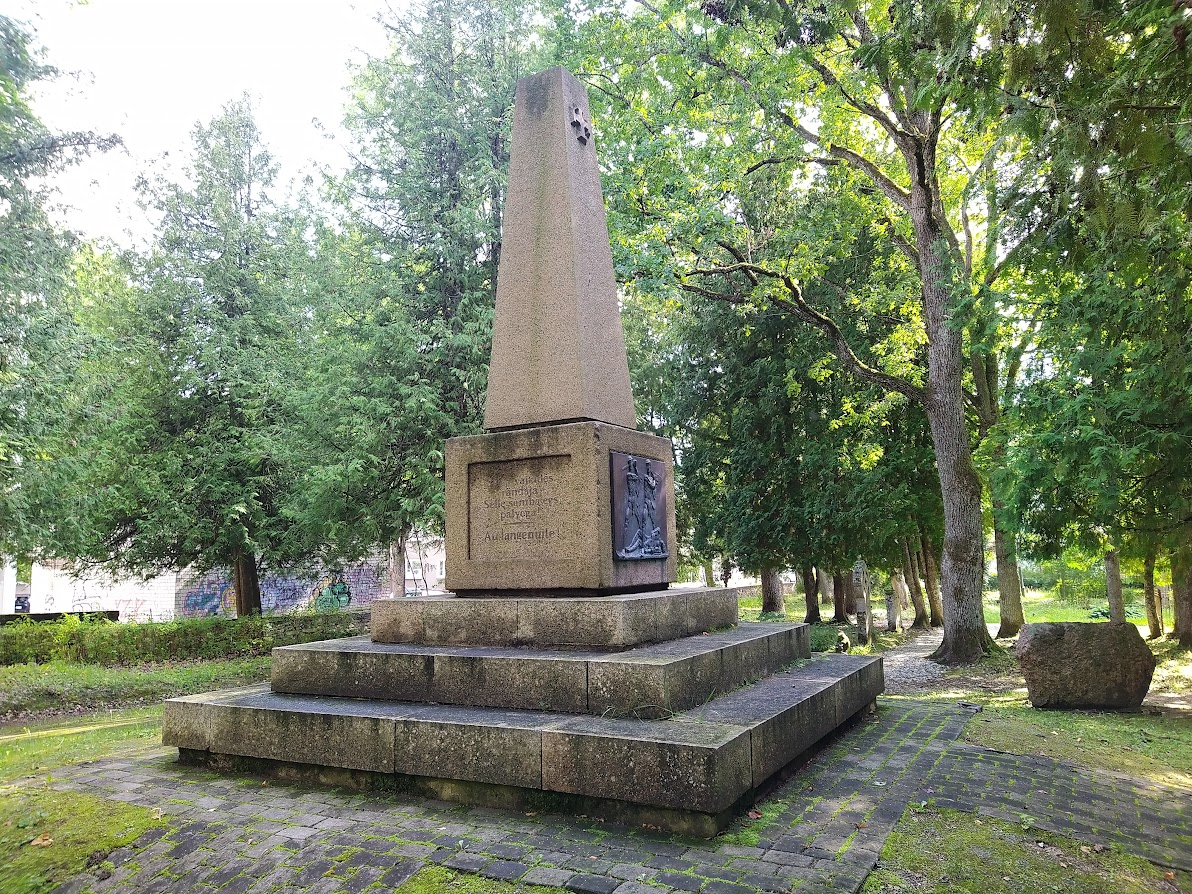
- Artist: Anton Starkopf
- Year: 1924; 102 years ago
- Medium: Granite

The Türi War of Independence Monument (Estonian: Türi Vabadussõja mälestussammas) is a monument erected in memory of those that fell in the Estonian War of Independence. It is located in Türi Central Cemetery in Türi, Järva County. The monument is registered as cultural heritage.

== History ==
The monument was designed by Anton Starkopf, and it was carved from granite by the stonemason August Pärn. The monument was unveiled on July 20, 1924.

After the March deportation of 1949, the monument was demolished. Later, the base of the demolished monument was found and was used as the base of a replica monument that was reinstalled on August 11, 1990. The brass plaques were restored by Hannes Starkopf.
