= Türi Central Cemetery =

Cemetery in Türi, Estonia

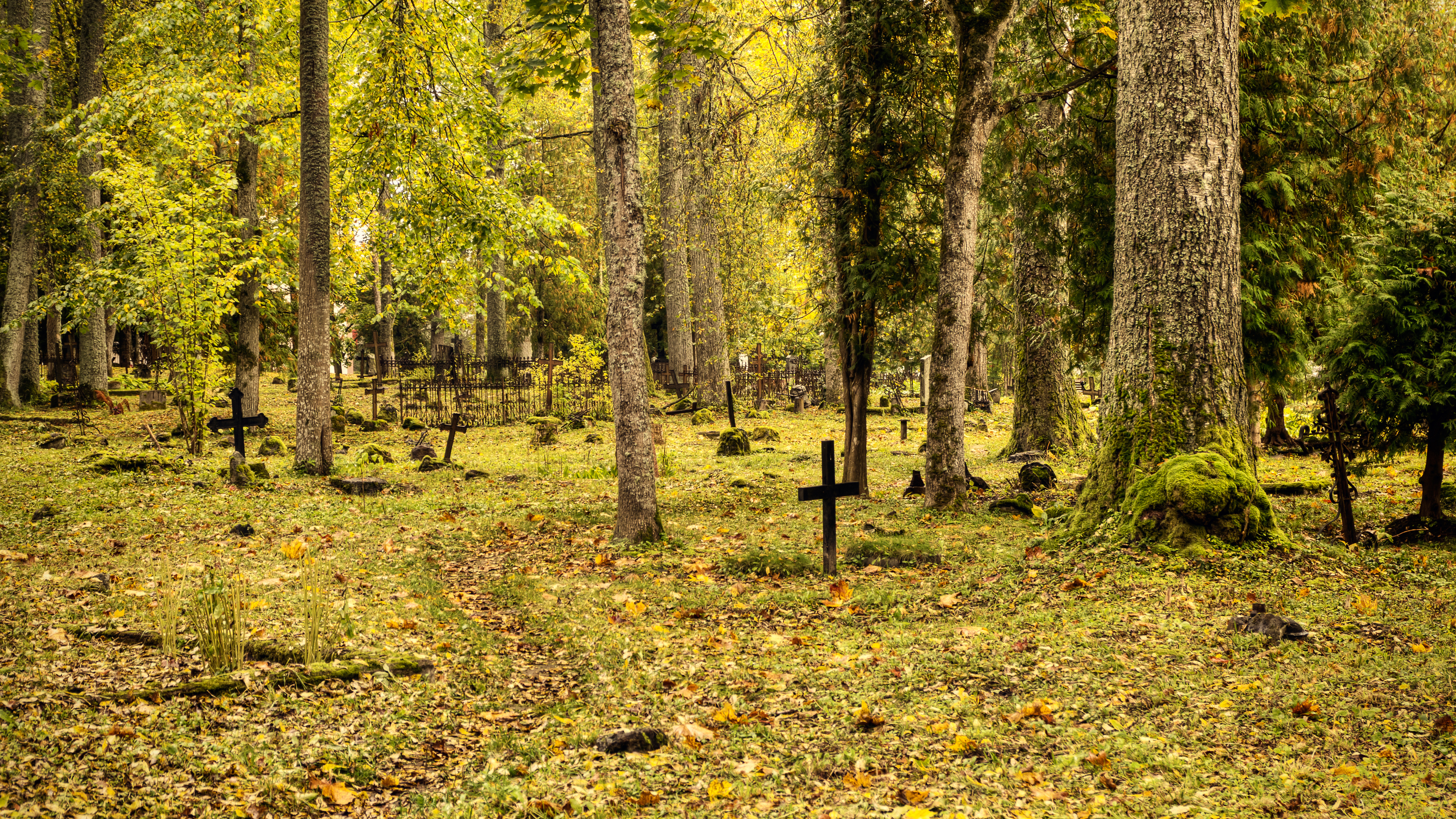
- Interactive map of Türi Central Cemetery

Details
- Location: Türi
- Country: Estonia
- Coordinates: 58°48′37″N 25°25′31″E
- Size: 4.48 ha (11.1 acres)

Türi Central Cemetery (Estonian: Türi Kesklinna kalmistu) is a cemetery in the town of Türi in Järva County, Estonia. The cemetery is located at the intersection of Little Pärnu Street (Väike-Pärnu tänav) and Lembitu Street (Lembitu tänav).

== Memorials ==
The following memorials are located in Türi Central Cemetery:

- The Türi War of Independence Monument, reinstalled on August 11, 1990
- A memorial to Estonians that fell in the First World War I (1914–1918)
- A memorial to Estonians that fell in the Second World War (1941–1945) and those that were deported and died in Siberia

== Notable burials ==
The following persons are buried in the cemetery:

- Jaan Lõvi (1853–1939), teacher at Retla School
- Mihkel Koik (1846–1893), curate of Türi Parish, first schoolmaster of the Türi Parish school
- Hans Viirmann (1869–1941), head of the Türi Parish school
- August Laas (1871–1939), first mayor of Türi (1927–1930)
