= Mey (surname) =

Mey is a surname (sometimes an alternative transliteration of Mei).

People with the name include:

== Arts and entertainment ==
- Alexandra Mey, (Claudia Alexandra Morales Mejías, born 1992), Venezuelan actress and producer
- Lev Mei or Mey (1822–1862), Russian dramatist and poet
- Marie-Anett Mey (born 1971), French entertainer
- Reinhard Mey (born 1942), German singer-songwriter
- Théo Mey (1912–1964), Luxembourg photographer
- Varvara P. Mey (1912–1995), Russian prima ballerina

== Politics ==
- Mey Norn (fl. from 2003), Cambodian politician
- Ousmane Mey (fl. from 1972), Cameroonian politician
- Piet Mey (born 1948), South African politician

== Sport ==
- François Carlo Mey (born 2003), Italian rugby player
- Jacob L. Mey (1926–2023), Dutch-born Danish professor of linguistics
- Karin Melis Mey (born 1983), Turkish long jumper
- Uwe-Jens Mey (born 1963), German speed skater

== Other ==
- Cornelius Jacobsen May or Mey, early 17th century Dutch explorer
- Karl Mey (1879–1945), German industrial physicist
- Kerstin Mey (born 1963), German academic, president of the University of Limerick, Ireland
- Ros Mey (1925–2010), Cambodian-born American Buddhist monk

== See also ==
- Mei (surname)
- May (surname)
