= Julius Mark =

Estonian linguist (1890–1959)

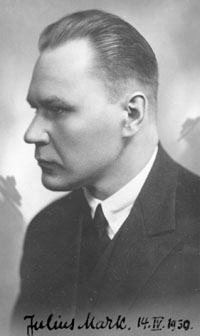
- Julius Mark in 1930
- Born: March 27, 1890; Idavere, Estonia
- Died: March 2, 1959 (aged 68); Washington, D.C., United States
- Occupation: Linguist
- Spouse: Kristine Mei
- Children: Karin Mark, Lüüdia Vallimäe-Mark, Elga Mark-Kurik

Julius Mark (March 27, 1890 – March 2, 1959) was an Estonian linguist. From 1938 to 1940, he was a member and vice-president of the Estonian Academy of Sciences.

== Early life and education ==
Julius Mark was born on March 27, 1890, in Idavere, the son of Juhan Mark (1851–1929) and Maria Mark (née Kalberk, 1851–1935). He received his high school education at the Russian-language Alexander High School in Tallinn. From 1911 to 1912 he studied at the University of Tartu, and from 1912 to 1915 at the University of Helsinki. He participated in World War I and the Estonian War of Independence. In 1918 he defended his master's thesis in Helsinki on Mordvin languages (especially Erzya). In 1923, as a student of Lauri Kettunen, Mark defended his doctoral dissertation Die Possessivsuffixe in den ostseefinnischen Sprachen (Possessive Suffixes in the Finnic languages) in Helsinki (published in 1925).

== Career ==
In 1919, Mark was invited to become an acting professor of Finno-Ugric and Samoyedic languages at the University of Tartu. After defending his doctoral dissertation, Mark was appointed a full professor of Uralic linguistics at the University of Tartu. He worked in this position until 1944, researching and teaching several languages, especially Sámi and Mordvin, later also Komi and Udmurt, the nature and history of Hungarian, as well as the relations between Finno-Ugric languages and languages of other language families, and general problems of linguistics. Mark also engaged in translation. Among other works, he translated Ferenc Molnár's The Paul Street Boys from Hungarian.

Mark was very strict in his teaching. He did not allow students to speak or ask questions in the auditorium, although he did interact with them in an informal atmosphere. When a student that had been studying in France dared mutter that Aurélien Sauvageot had a different opinion on a certain issue, Mark sent him out of the auditorium, and the matter ended with him going to study forestry instead.

From 1922 to 1924, Mark was the first editor-in-chief of the journal Eesti Keel of the Academic Mother Tongue Society.

At the first plenary meeting of the Estonian Academy of Sciences on April 20, 1938, Mark was elected vice-president of the academy. He was also the editor of the first yearbook of the Estonian Academy of Sciences (published in 1940).

Mark's life after the war continued in exile; he left Estonia in 1944, initially staying in Denmark, then from 1947 in the United States, where he was a professor of Russian at Harvard University and from 1951 a professor of Finnish at Georgetown University in Washington, D.C. His rich collections of linguistic and ethnographic material remained in Estonia.

Mark died on March 2, 1959, in Washington.

== Research ==
Mark participated in the work of the Learned Estonian Society and was elected chairman of the society in 1929 (he held this position until 1936). At his initiative, the society adopted Estonian as its working language. He encouraged young scholars to speak at the society and publish their works in the society's publications. Mark himself published both linguistic and ethnographic studies in the society's yearbook and proceedings, such as on the complex forms of the da/dä infinitive in Finnic languages, grain harvesting and threshing in Estonia, and other topics. Mark also established close ties with researchers of Finnic languages in other countries.

Mark went on research trips to Hungary (1912, 1924), Finnish Lapland (1925, 1926), and the Finno-Ugric areas of the Soviet Union (1929). Based on his research and organizational activities, Mark became a member of the Humanities Section of the Estonian Academy of Sciences in 1938. As a member of the Estonian National Committee of the League of Nations International Committee on Intellectual Cooperation, he participated in the preparations for the establishment of the academy.

== Works ==
- 1914: Ungari kirjanduse ülevaade (Review of Hungarian Literature), Tartu
- 1925: Mõned jooned tšeremisside, votjakite, sürjanite ja mordvalaste käekäigust peale 1917. aastat (Some Aspects of the Fate of the Cheremis, Votyaks, Syryans, and Mordovians after 1917), Tartu
- 1927: Etymologische Beiträge (Etymological Contributions), Helsinki
- 1929: Lapi pulmakommetest (The Wedding Customs of Lapland), Tartu
- 1936: Soome-ugri rahvaste kaubandusest (The Trade of the Finno-Ugric Peoples), Tartu

== Memberships ==
Mark was elected a member of the following societies:

- 1923: Member of the Hungarian Finno-Ugric Society
- 1923: Member of the Turan Federation of Hungary
- 1930: Member of the Budapest La Fontaine Society
- 1933: Member of the Hungarian Academy of Sciences
- 1937: Member of the Hungarian Linguistic Society
- 1938: Member of the Estonian Academy of Sciences

== Family ==
Mark's brother was the economist Reinhold Mark. Mark was married to the sculptor and graphic artist Kristine Mei (1895–1969) from 1921 to 1941. Their daughters were the anthropologist Karin Mark (1922–1999), the painter and printmaker Lüüdia Vallimäe-Mark (1925–2004), and the paleontologist Elga Mark-Kurik (1928–2016).
