= Idavere =

Village in Estonia

Coordinates: 59°25′N 26°20′E

- Village
- Interactive map of Idavere
- Country: Estonia
- County: Lääne-Viru County
- Parish: Haljala Parish
- Time zone: UTC+2 (EET)
  - Summer (DST): UTC+3 (EEST)

Idavere is a village in Haljala Parish, Lääne-Viru County, in northeastern Estonia.

== Notable people ==
Notable people that were born or lived in Idavere include the following:

- Julius Mark (1890–1959), Estonian linguist
