= Ellen Niit =

Estonian writer

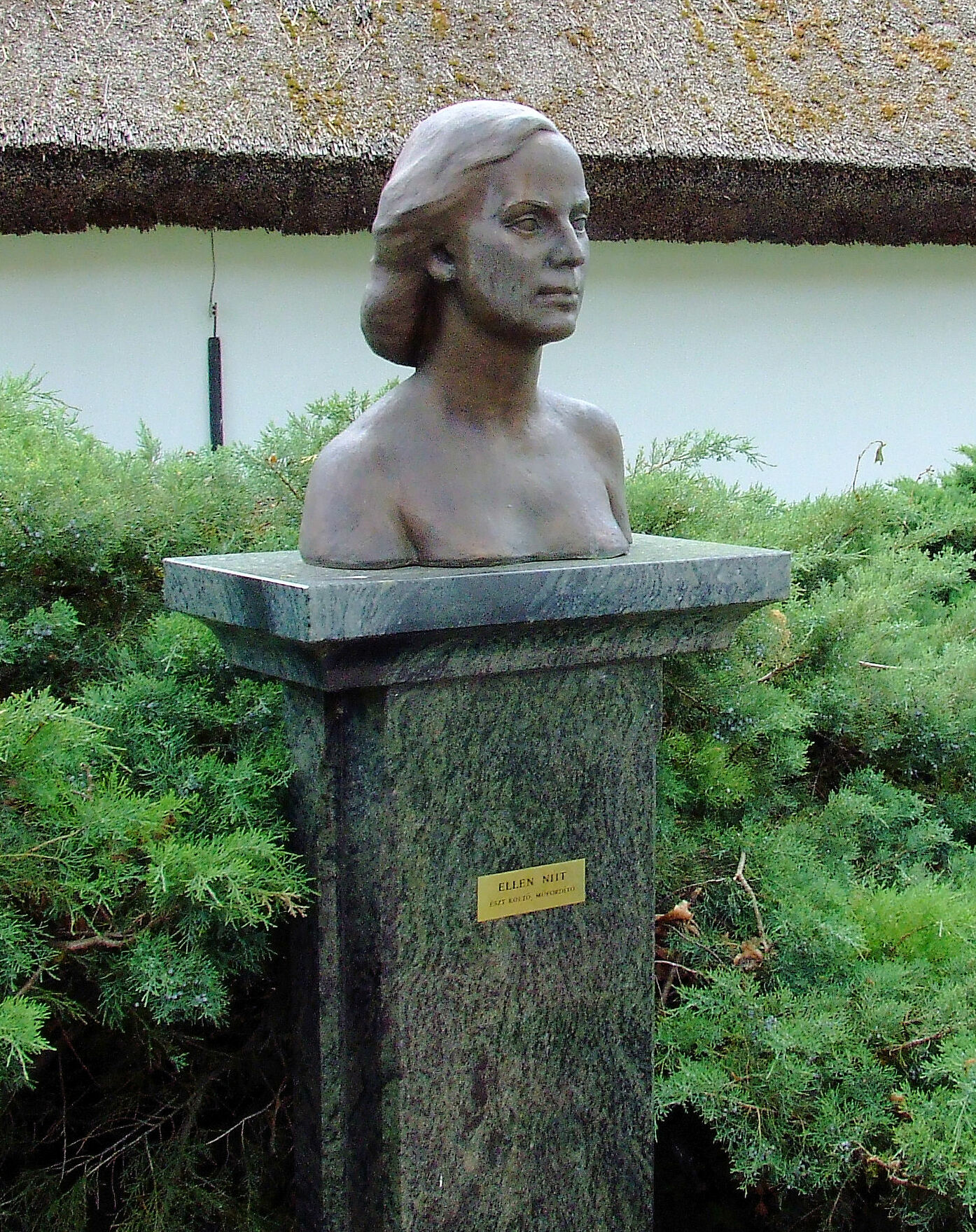
- 1954 bust of Ellen Niit, sculpted by Erna Viitol
- Born: Ellen Hiob; 13 July 1928; Tallinn, Estonia
- Died: 30 May 2016 (aged 87); Tallinn, Estonia
- Education: University of Tartu
- Occupations: Writer, translator
- Years active: 1954–2016
- Spouse(s): Heldur Niit (1949–1958); Jaan Kross(1958–2007; his death)
- Children: Toomas Niit; Maarja Undusk; Eerik-Niiles Kross; Märten Kross
- Awards: Order of the White Star, III Class

Ellen Niit (born Ellen Hiob; Ellen Niit since 1958) (13 July 1928 – 30 May 2016) was an Estonian children's writer, poet and translator. Over her lifetime, she penned more than forty books of both prose and poetry for children. She also wrote a number of collections of prose and poetry for adults. Her works have been translated into eighteen languages.

== Biography ==
Ellen Hiob was born in 1928 in Tallinn, Estonia. She attended school in Tapa and in Tallinn, and then graduated from the University of Tartu with a degree in Estonian philology in 1952. After working as a poetry consultant at the Writers' Union of Estonia from 1956 to 1961, she was forced to resign for ideological reasons. Afterward, Niit worked as an editor of children's television programmes, and in 1963 she became a freelance translator and writer.

Hiob first married the folklorist and literary scholar Heldur Niit in 1949. They had one son, the noted psychologist Toomas Niit, in 1953. The couple divorced in 1958, and the same year she wed the writer Jaan Kross; their children are Maarja Undusk (born 1959), Eerik-Niiles Kross (born 1967), and Märten Kross (1970).

== Selected works ==
=== Poetry books ===
- Kuidas leiti nääripuu (Finding the Christmas Tree), Eesti Riiklik Kirjastus 1954; Mixi kirjastus 2000; Tammerraamat 2013
- Rongisõit (The Train Ride), Eesti Riiklik Kirjastus 1957; Tammerraamat, 2013
- Karud saavad aru (The Bears Will Understand), Eesti Raamat 1967, 1971, 1972; Eesti Päevaleht 2010
- Lahtiste uste päev (Open Door Day), Eesti Raamat 1970
- Suur maalritöö (Colouring the World), Eesti Raamat 1971, 1985; Elmatar 2008; Tammerraamat 2015; A Film Eesti & Tammerraamat 2014
- Midrimaa (Wonderland), Eesti Raamat 1974
- Krõlli-raamat (The Book of Krõll), Eesti Raamat 1979
- Oma olemine, turteltulemine (One's Own Beings and Comings), Eesti Raamat 1979
- Filmikrõll (Nippet), Perioodika 1980
- Suur suislepapuu (A Huge Apple Tree), Eesti Raamat 1983
- Meil maal (At Our Farm), Eesti Raamat 1985
- Tere, tere, lambatall! (Hello There, Little Lamb!), 1993
- Kuidas Krõll tahtis põrandat pesta (How Krõll Tried to Mop the Floor), 1993
- Krõlli pannkoogitegu (Krõll Makes Pancakes), Elmatar 1995
- Ühel viivul vikervalgel (At a Rainbow-Light Moment), Tiritamm 1999
- Kaelasall päkapikule (A Scarf for a Dwarf), Huma 2000
- Veel ja veel. Krõlliga maal ja veel (More and More. On Land and Water with Krõll), Elmatar 2002
- Taeva võti: luulet lastele 1954–2008 (The Key of Heaven), Tammerraamat 2012
- Mänguvesi (Playing With Water), Tammerraamat 2013

=== Prose ===
- Pille-Riini lood (Pille-Riin's Stories), Eesti Riiklik Kirjastus 1963; Eesti Raamat 1971; Tiritam, 2003; TEA Kirjastus 2008, 2013; Tammerraamat 2013
- Jutt jänesepojast, kes ei tahtnud magama jääda (The Story of the Bunny Who Didn't Want to Fall Asleep), Eesti Raamat 1967, 1970; Tiritamm 2007; Tammerraamat 2018
- Triinu ja Taavi jutud (Stories about Triinu and Taavi), Eesti Raamat 1970
- Triinu ja Taavi uued ja vanad lood (Triinu's and Taavi's New and Old Tales), Eesti Raamat 1977; TEA Kirjastus 2007, 2013, Tammerraamat 2017
- Ott kosmoses (Ott's Adventures in Space), Perioodika 1979
- Jänesepoja õhtu koos isaga (The Little Bunny's Night with Father), Perioodika 1982
- Onu Ööbiku ööpäev (Mr. Nightingale's Twenty-Four Hours), Tiritamm 1998
- Onu Ööbik Öösorri tänavast (Mr. Nightingale from Nightjar Street), Tammerraamat 2017

== Awards and honors ==
- 1971 Juhan Smuul Annual Prize of Literature (Open Door Day)
- 1977 Honored Writer of the Estonian SSR
- 1978 Juhan Smuul Annual Prize of Literature (Triinu ja Taavi uued ja vanad lood)
- 1994 Karl Eduard Sööt Children's Poetry Award (Hello There, Little Lamb!, How Krõll Tried to Mop the Floor)
- 1996 IBBY Honour List (Krõll Makes Pancakes)
- 1999 Annual Children's Literature Award of the Cultural Endowment of Estonia (At a Rainbow-Light Moment)
- 1999 Order of the White Star, III Class
- 2005 Lifetime achievement award from the E. W. Ponkala Fund for furthering cultural relations between Finland, Estonia, and Hungary
- 2009 Estonian State Cultural Award
- 2010 Tallinn Coat of Arms Badge
- 2004–2009 Astrid Lindgren Memorial Award candidate
- 2018 The White Ravens (Mr. Nightingale from Nightjar Street)
