= Anna Kong Mei =

Chinese social worker

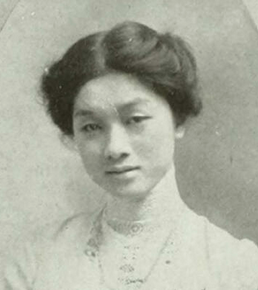
- Anna Fojin Kong (later Mei), from the 1915 Barnard College yearbook
- Born: Kong Fo-jin; February 22, 1891; Hong Kong
- Died: February 24, 1958; Oakland, California
- Other names: Anna K. Mei, Annie Fo-jin Kong
- Occupation(s): Social worker, educator, clubwoman

Anna Fojin Kong Mei (February 22, 1891 – February 24, 1958) was a Chinese-American social worker, clubwoman, writer, and educator. She was vice president of the Pan Pacific Women's Association, vice president of the World YWCA, and national president of the YWCA in China.

== Early life and education ==
Anna Fo-jin Kong was born in Hong Kong. She graduated from McKinley High School in Honolulu in 1911, attended the University of California for a year, and graduated from Barnard College in 1915. Later in life, she attended Berkeley Baptist Divinity School, to maintain student status for her visa while awaiting permanent resident status.

== Career ==
After college, Kong went back to China, where she taught at a girls' school. She was vice president of the World YWCA, and national president of the YWCA in China. She was founder and president of the Shanghai Women's Club. Mei was vice president of the Pan Pacific Women's Association, and attended the Association's 1937 conference in Vancouver, the timing of which prevented her return to China.

In the United States again after 1942, she wrote a pamphlet of recipes, Chinese rice bowl: Chinese dishes in American kitchens (1943), taught citizenship classes, and spoke about China to women's groups. "A nation can only be as strong as its weakest part," she told an audience in Oakland in 1943, "and if its women are strong half the battle is won."

== Publications ==
- "The Physical Department of the Y. W. C. A." (1916)
- "The Modern Chinese Woman: Her Work and Problems" (1924)
- Chinese rice bowl: Chinese dishes in American kitchens (1943, pamphlet)

== Personal life ==
Anna Kong married attorney Hua-Chuen Mei in 1916, in China. They lived in Shanghai for 23 years, and had three children, Lincoln, Julia, and Elizabeth (Betty). She returned to California as a wartime refugee, while her husband was a prisoner of war, held by the Japanese in the Philippines. She was granted permanent residence in the United States by an act of Congress in 1948, and became a United States citizen in 1950. Her husband died in 1953, and she died in 1958, at the age of 67, in Oakland, California.
