= Nicola Mei =

Italian basketball player

Personal information
- Born: October 27, 1985 (age 41) Lucca
- Listed height: 6 ft 1 in (1.85 m)
- Listed weight: 180 lb (82 kg)

Career information
- Playing career: 2004–present
- Position: Guard

Career history
- 2004–2005: Virtus Imola
- 2005–2006: G.S. Riva del Garda
- 2006–2007: Virtus Siena
- 2007–2008: Pallacanestro Firenze
- 2008–2009: Pallacanestro Sant'Antimo
- 2009–2010: RB Montecatini Terme
- 2010–2011: Recanati Basket
- 2011–2012: Virtus Siena
- 2012: Assi Basket Ostuni
- 2012–2013: Perugia Basket
- 2013–2014: Pallacanestro Varese
- 2014–2015: Vanoli Cremona

Nicola Mei (born October 27, 1985) is an Italian professional basketball player. He last played for Vanoli Cremona.
