= Heino Kiik =

Estonian writer and journalist

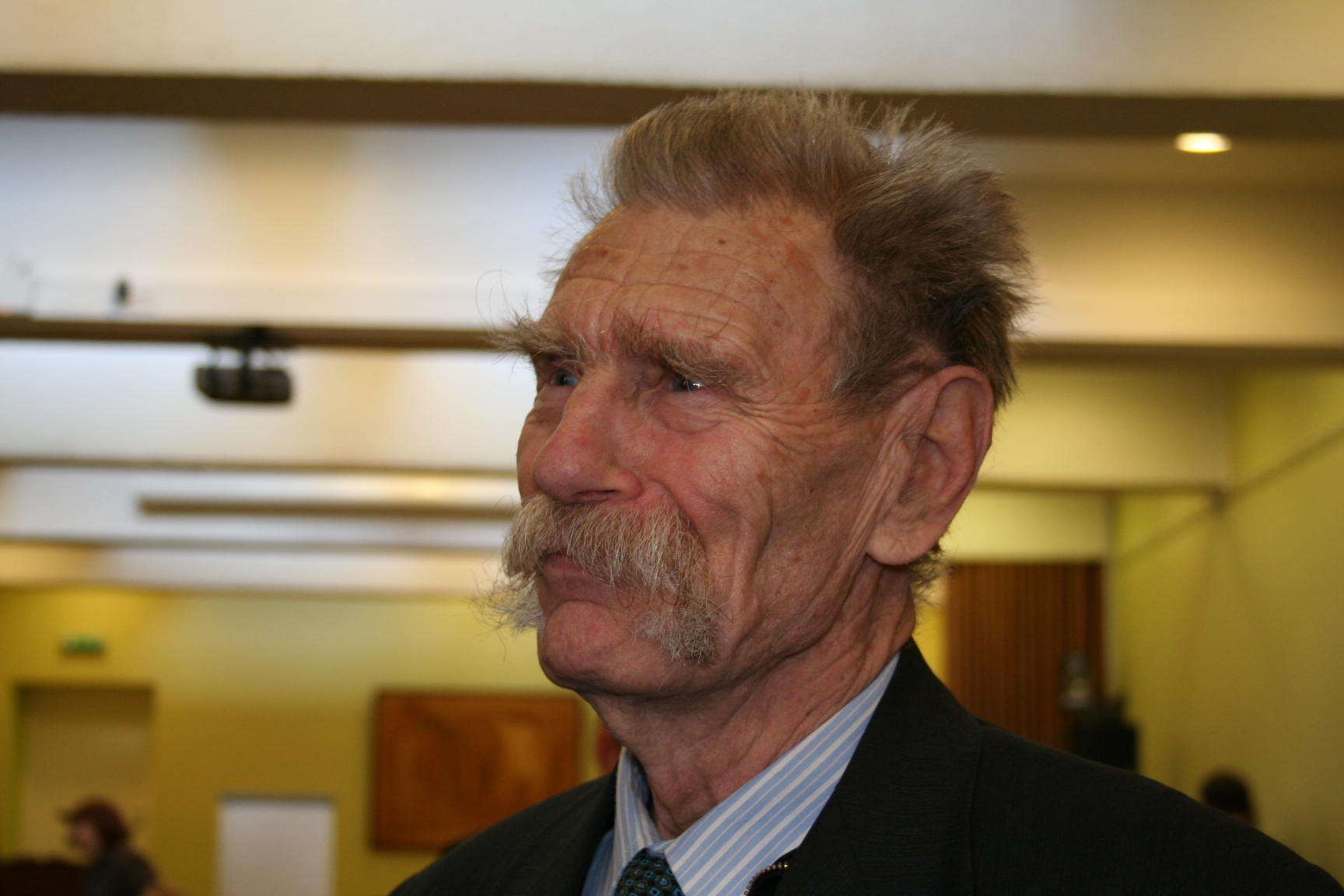
Heino Kiik

Heino Kiik (14 May 1927 Avinurme – 22 February 2013) was an Estonian writer and journalist.

He studied agronomy at the University of Tartu and the Estonian Agricultural Academy. Later he studied at the Maxim Gorky Literature Institute in Moscow.

Heino Kiik was a member of the Estonian Blue Party from 1994 to 2000, the Estonian Democratic Party from 2000 to 2002, and then the Isamaa party.

== Works ==
- "Metsiku taltsutamine" (1965)
- "Mõedaku eelpäev" (1966)
- "Tondiöömaja" (1970)
- "Taimetark I-III" (1968–1986)
- novel "Arve Jomm" (1971–1990)
- play "Tütarlaps ja teised" (1974)
- "Maailma viljad" (1982–1986)
- "Elupadrik" (1986)
- "Mind armastas jaapanlanna" (I part 1987, II part 1990, III part 1992)
- "Maria Siberimaal" (1988)
- "Aasta 1988" (Tallinn, Õllu 1990)
- ""Kupra" lõhenemine (aasta 1989)" (Tallinn, Õllu 1992)
- "Kirjanike elamu (aasta 1977)" (Tallinn, Õllu 1993)
