= Juhan Maiste =

Estonian art historian

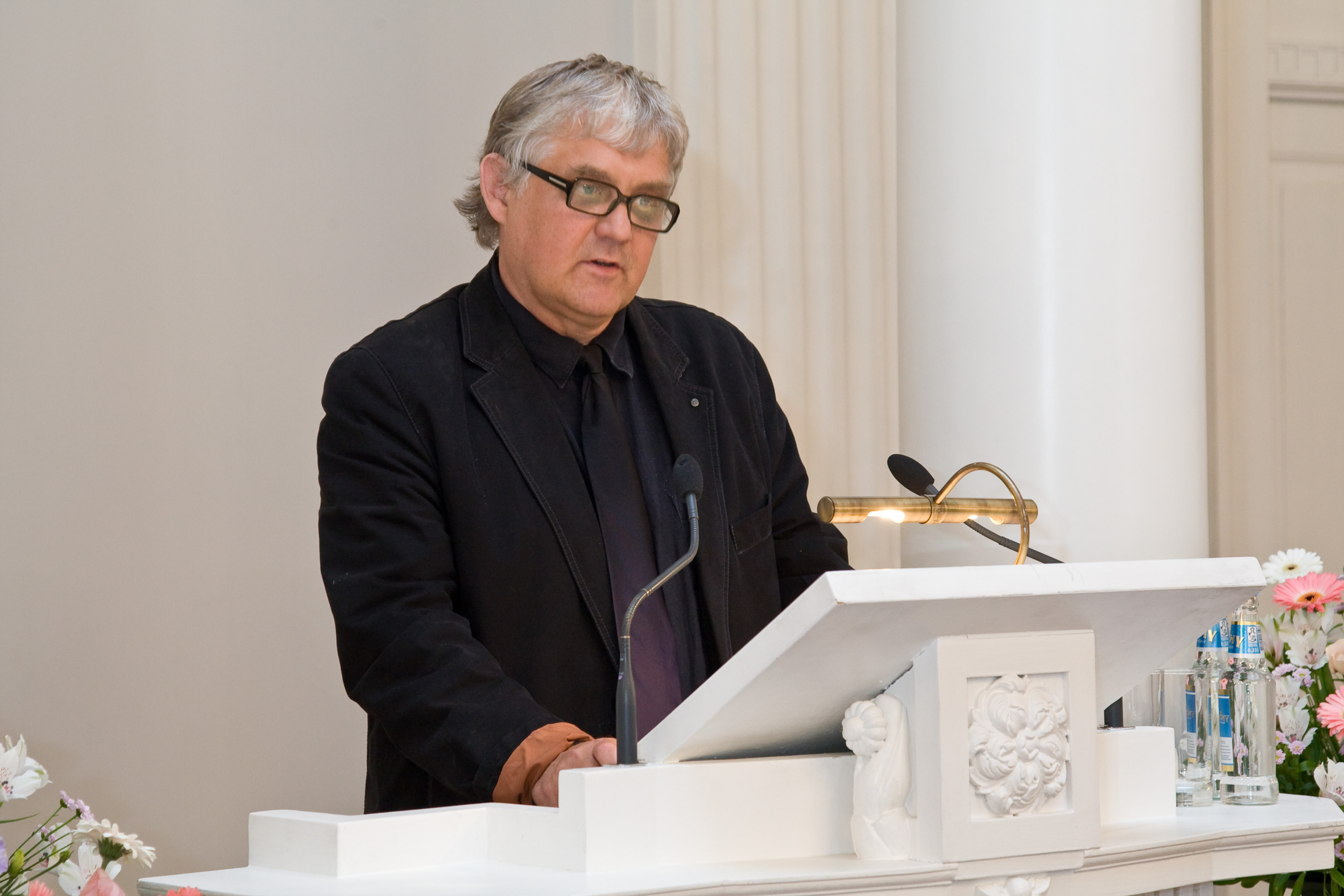
Juhan Maiste

Juhan Maiste (born 10 August 1952 in Kehra) is an Estonian art historian.

In 1976 he graduated from Tartu State University with a degree in art history. Since 2007 he has been a professor at the University of Tartu.

Since 2009 he is the chief editor of the Baltic Journal of Art History.

== Awards ==
- 2002: Order of the White Star, IV class.

== Publications ==
- 1993: "Ajan sydämessä: matka Tallinnasta Tarttoon". Translated by Kaisu Lahikainen. Helsinki: Tammi. 216 pp. ISBN 978-951-30-9956-5
- 1995: "Linnoissa kreivien: Viron kartanoita ja kartanokulttuuria". Suomentanut Juhani Salokannel. Helsinki: Otava. 224 pp. ISBN 978-951-1-13418-3
- 1995: "Mustpeade maja. The house of the Brotherhood of Blackheads". Tallinn: Kunst. 127 pp. ISBN 978-5-89920-097-7
- 1996: " Eestimaa mõisad. Manorial architecture in Estonia. Gutsarchitektur in Estland". Tallinn: Kunst. 454 pp. ISBN 978-5-89920-023-6
- 1999: "Eesti. Minevik ja tänapäev. Estonia. Past and present. Estland. Vergangenheit und Gegenwart". Tallinn: Koolibri. 96 pp. ISBN 978-9985-0-0802-7
- 2007: "Eesti kunsti lugu". Tallinn: Varrak. 519 pp. ISBN 978-9985-3-1554-5
- 2007: "Tuldud teed edasi. Along the trodden path". Tallinn: J. Maiste. 374 pp. ISBN 978-9949-15-544-6
- 2014: "101 Eesti mõisa". Tallinn: Varrak. 224 pp. ISBN 978-9985-3-2923-8
