= Hannes Starkopf =

Estonian sculptor (1965–2021)

- Born: January 7, 1965; Tallinn, then part of Estonian SSR, Soviet Union
- Died: August 19, 2021 (aged 56)
- Resting place: Pärnamäe Cemetery
- Occupation: Sculptor
- Relatives: Anton Starkopf (grandfather)

Hannes Starkopf (January 7, 1965 – August 19, 2021) was an Estonian sculptor.

== Early life and education ==
Starkopf was born in Tallinn. He graduated from Tallinn Secondary School No. 43 in 1983 and from Tallinn Art University in 1991 as a sculptor.

== Career ==
Starkopf worked as a lecturer at the Estonian Academy of Arts from 1993 onward, and he became the head of the Department of General Sculpture in 1995.

== Works ==
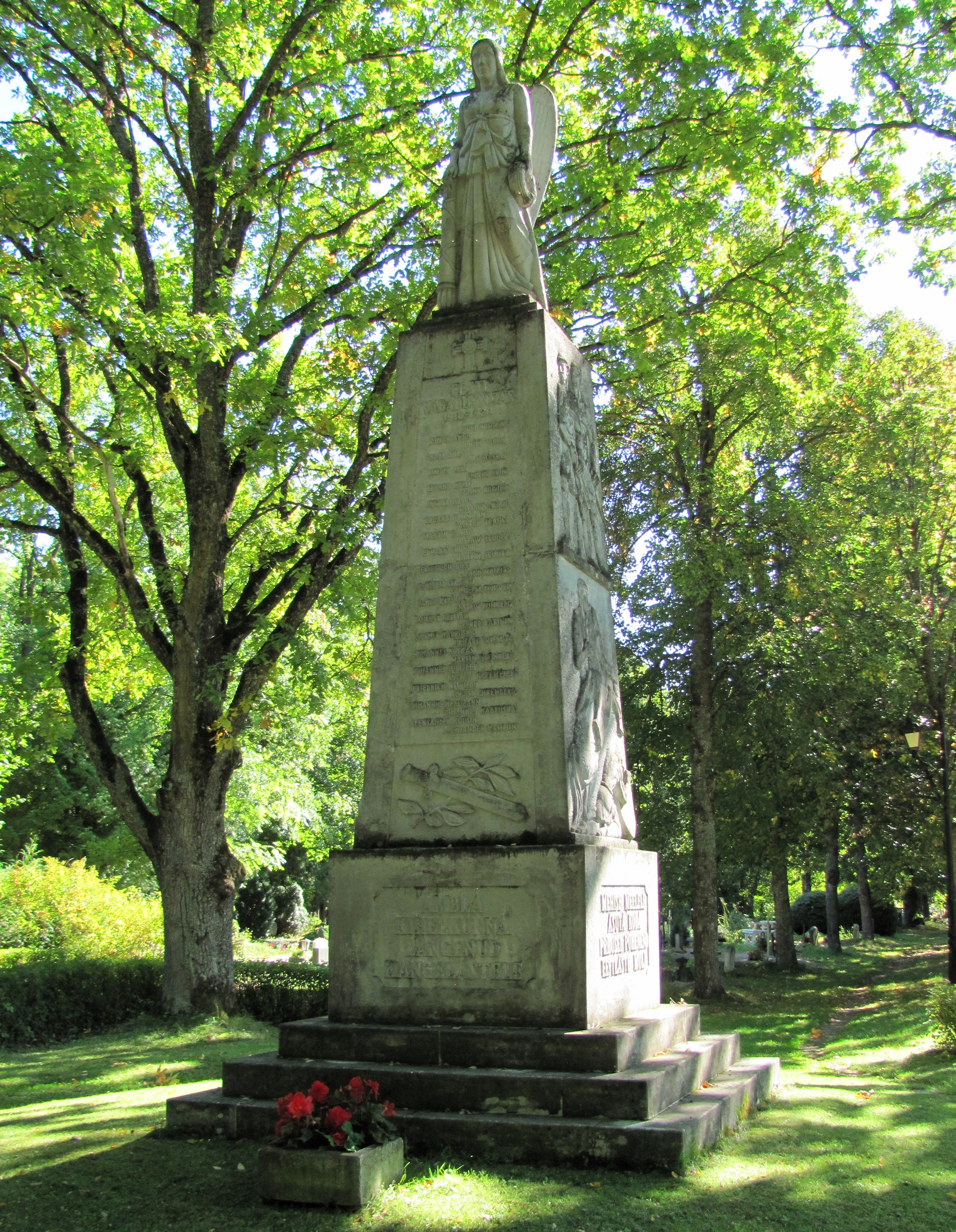
Ambla War of Independence Monument (angel, 1988)

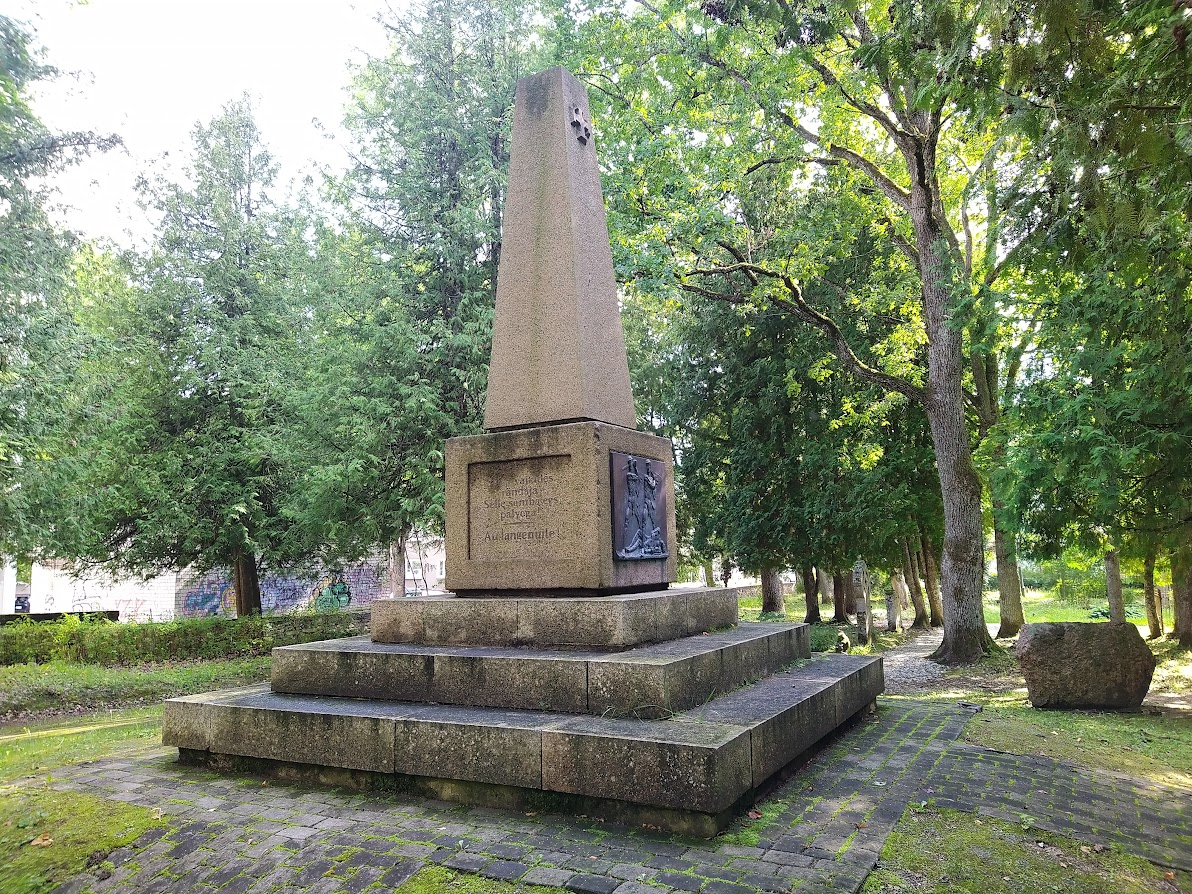
Türi War of Independence Monument (bronze reliefs, 1988)

As a student, Starkopf restored two of Anton Starkopf's War of Independence monuments in 1988, recarving the angel statue of the Ambla War of Independence Monument and restoring the bronze reliefs of the Türi War of Independence Monument. His public sculptures include a painted bronze angel statue in the courtyard of Gustavus Adolphus High School (2005), a bust of Gustavus Adolphus for the interior (2006), and the Albert Uustulnd Monument in Kuressaare (2015).

== Family ==
His grandfather was the sculptor Anton Starkopf. His brother is the medical researcher Joel Starkopf.
