= Anna Mei =

Italian cyclist

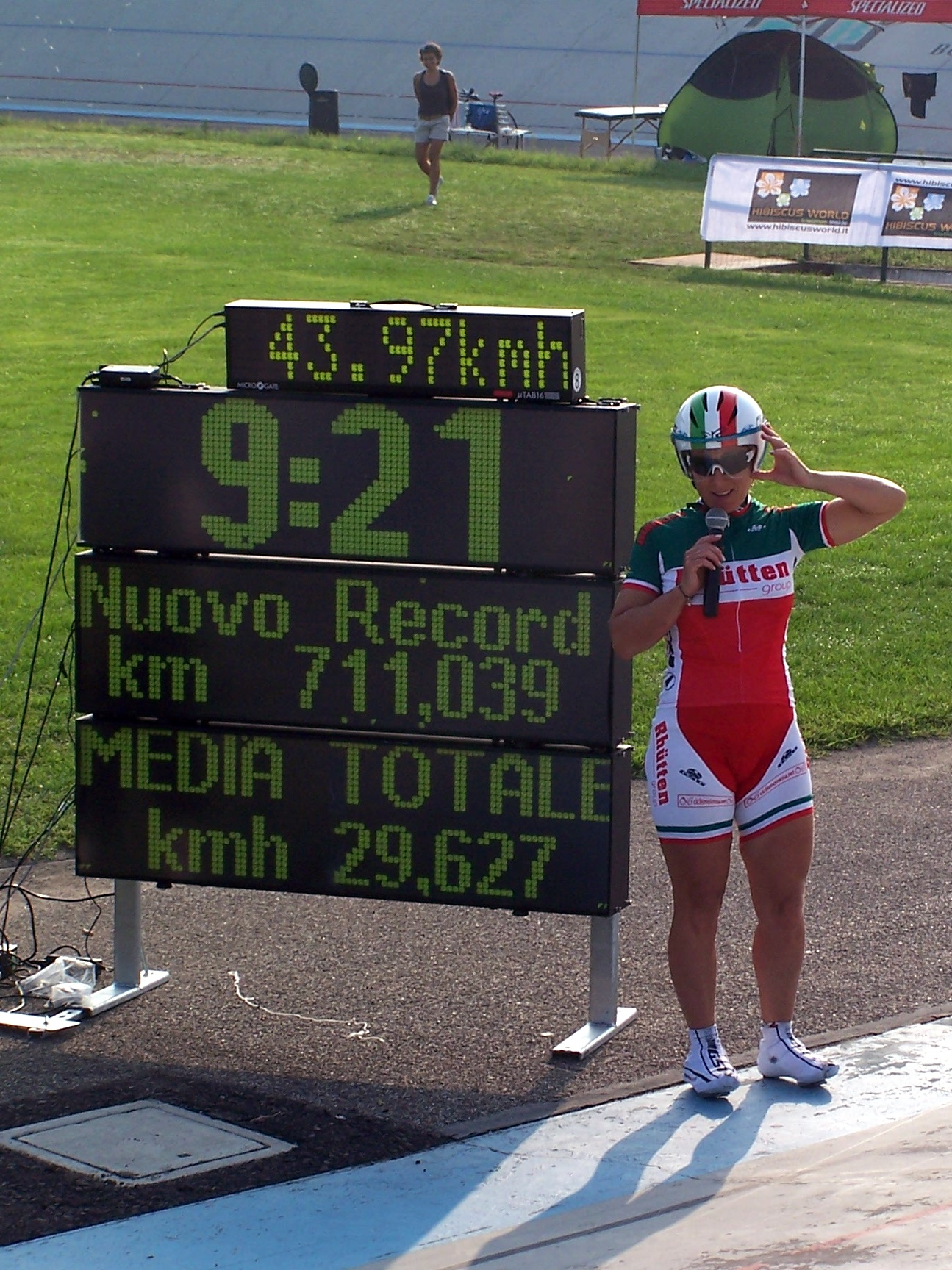
- Mei after breaking the 24h velodrome record in 2011

Personal information
- Full name: Anna Mei
- Born: 10 July 1967 Milan, Italy

Cycling career
- Sport: Cycling
- Disciplines: Long distance Road and Mountain bike racing
- Role: Rider
- Rider type: Long distance, Endurance

Anna Mei (10 July 1967) is a racing cyclist, mountain biker and a breaker of long-distance (24h) records. She set the women's velodrome record at 441.55 miles (711.04 km), average speed 18.40 mph (29.63 km/h) at the Roberto Battaglia velodrome in Busto Garolfo (Italy) in September 2011.

== Palmarès ==
- 2009 : Winner 24h MTB World Solo Championship, Age Group Mtb - Canmore, Alberta
- 2010 : Winner 24h MTB World Solo Championship, Age Group Mtb - Mount Stromlo, Canberra, Australia
- 2010 : Winner 24h Ultracycling del Montello, Age Group, Italian Championship
- 2010 : Winner Milano - Sanremo, Age Group
