= Peeter Mei =

Estonian military officer (1893–1941)

- Born: April 23, 1893; Liepāja, Latvia
- Died: November 27, 1941 (aged 48); Ivdel gulag, Soviet Union
- Occupation: Military officer
- Father: Johan Mey
- Relatives: Kristine Mei, Lydia Mei, Natalie Mei

Peeter Mei (until April 8, 1935, Mey; until April 30, 1935, Peter Friedrich Eustachius; April 24, 1893 – November 27, 1941) was an Estonian military officer.

== Career ==
Peeter Mei graduated from the Russian Naval Cadet Corps and was a coastal defense commander and artillery expert. He served in the First World War from November 1914 to May 1916 as an officer in the coastal batteries of Peter the Great's Naval Fortress (in coastal batteries nos. 5 and 6 on Naissaar and in coastal battery no. 35 in the village of Lepiku in the southern part of Hiiumaa); from November 1915 to May 1916, he was the commander of coastal battery no. 37 in Dirhami.

On August 22, 1921, he was arrested in St. Petersburg as a counter-revolutionary and an Estonian secret agent, and he was exchanged as a prisoner for Estonia on March 16, 1922. On May 9, 1922, Mei joined the Estonian Navy and served as an officer and commander of the coastal battery no. 1 on the island of Aegna until December 15, 1924. He was then appointed as an artillery officer of the Technical Department of the Naval Staff. He held the rank of lieutenant senior grade (Estonian: vanemleitnant), and he was promoted to captain major (Estonian: kaptenmajor) in the Estonian Navy in 1928.

After the occupation of Estonia, Mei was demobilized at the end of 1940. On August 8, 1941, Mei was mobilized into the Soviet Army and sent to Leningrad. He was later assigned to a labor battalion at the Ivdel gulag in the Sverdlovsk Oblast, where he died, apparently from typhus.

== Family ==
Peeter Mei was the son of the hydrographer Johan Mey. His sisters were the artists Kristine Mei, Lydia Mei, and Natalie Mei.

== Legacy ==
In 2021, the Estonian Art Museum's Art Lovers' Society presented the Art Museum of Estonia with a bust of Peeter Mei created by the sculptor Anton Starkopf in the 1920s.
