= Anton Starkopf =

Estonian sculptor (1889–1966)

Anton Starkopf (22 April 1889, Röa, Rapla County – 30 December 1966, Tartu) was an Estonian sculptor.

From 1911 to 1912, he studied at Anton Ažbe's art school in Munich, and from 1912 to 1913 at the Académie Russe and Académie de la Grande Chaumière in Paris. During World War I, he was a prisoner of war in Dresden, Germany. In 1918, he returned to Estonia. There he was one of the founders of the Pallas Art School. He taught there from 1919 to 1940, and from 1929 to 1940 he was also the director of this school. From 1944 to 1950, he was the head of the sculpture department at the Tartu State Art Institute, and its director from 1945 to 1948. In 1950, he moved to Moscow. There he worked in Merkurov's studio.

He was married to the Estonian artist Lydia Mei from 1920 to 1928. His grandsons include the sculptor Hannes Starkopf and the medical researcher Joel Starkopf.

The Anton Starkopf Fellowship is named after him.

== Notable works ==
- Drowning Man
- Portrait Head of Peeter Mei, 1920s
- Boy with Poppies (Poiss moonidega), 1923
- Türi War of Independence Monument (Türi Vabadussõja mälestussammas), 1924
- Ambla War of Independence Monument (Ambla Vabadussõja mälestussammas), 1925
- Sunbather (Päevitaja), 1936
- Mother and Child (Ema ja laps), 1938
