= Ambla =

Borough in Estonia

- Small borough
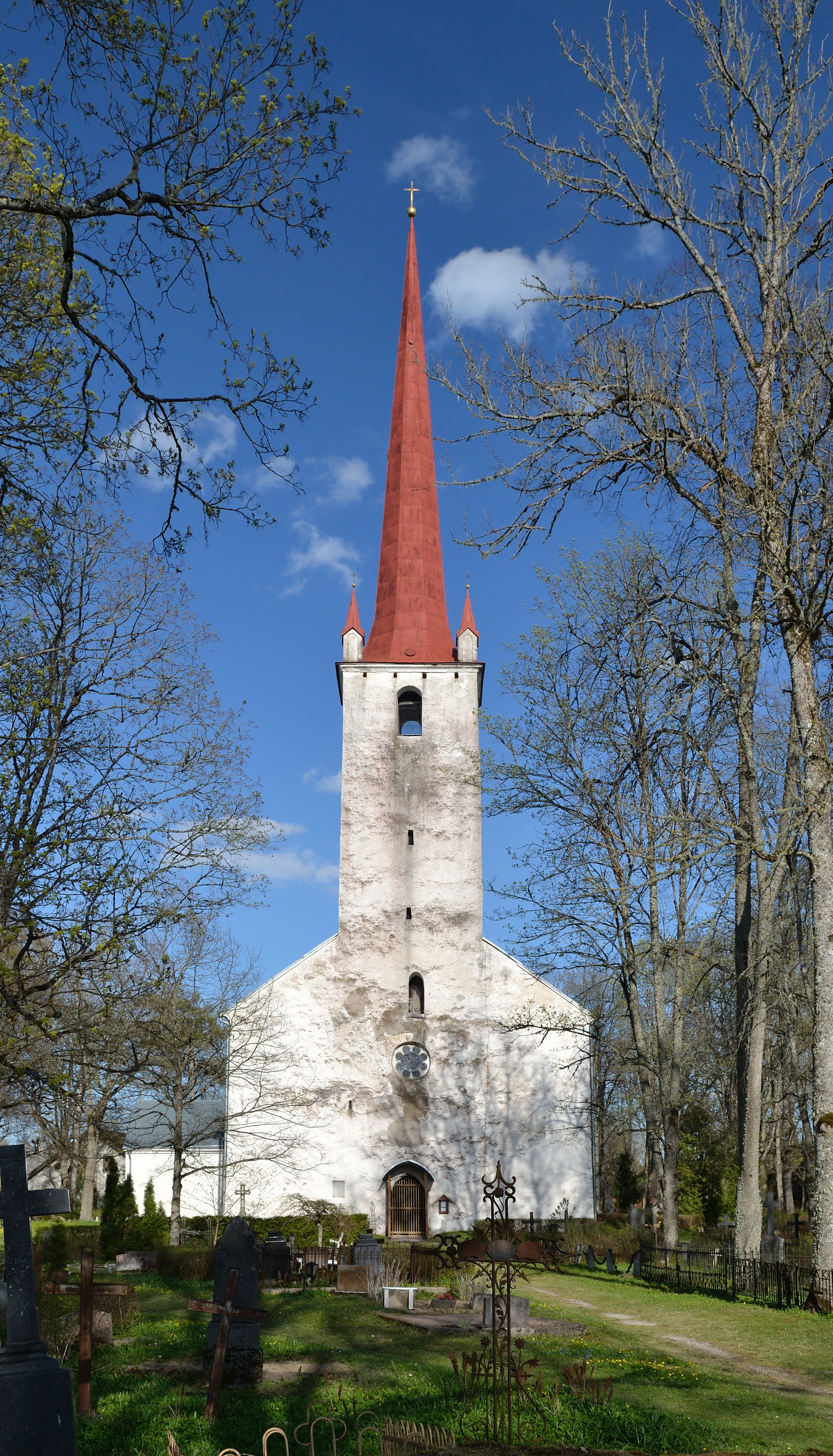
- Ambla church

- Location in Estonia
- Coordinates: 59°11′32″N 25°50′21″E
- Country: Estonia
- County: Järva County
- Municipality: Järva Parish

Population (2011 Census)
  - Total: 299

Ambla (German: Ampel) is a small borough (Estonian: alevik) in Järva County, in Järva Parish, in central Estonia. It was the administrative centre of Ambla Parish. As of the 2011 census, the settlement's population was 299.

== Name ==
Ambla was attested in historical sources as Ampele or Ample in 1253, Ampel in 1467, Ampla in 1711, and Ambla in 1782. The origin of the name is uncertain. Derivation from Latin amplus (feminine ampla) 'magnificent, splendid, glorious' via a church name Amplae Mariae 'great, magnificent Mary' is unlikely. Enn Tarvel concluded that the name is of Estonian origin. Lauri Kettunen reconstructed the name as *Ampula and said that it could be connected to the word amb 'crossbow' or to the personal name *Ambo(i). Popular etymology associates the name with the shooting of an ox, or with crossbows.

== Gallery ==
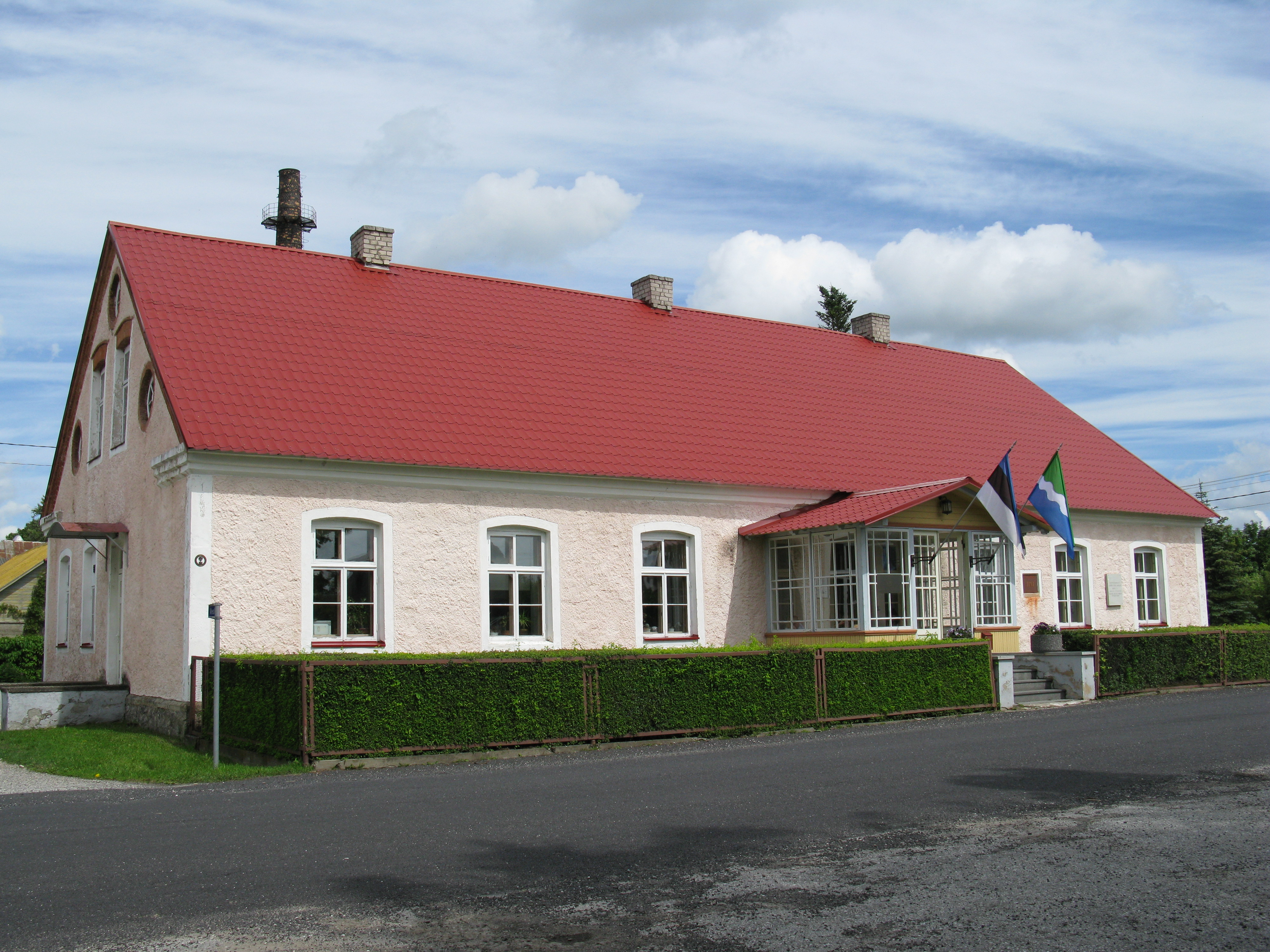
Ambla town hall

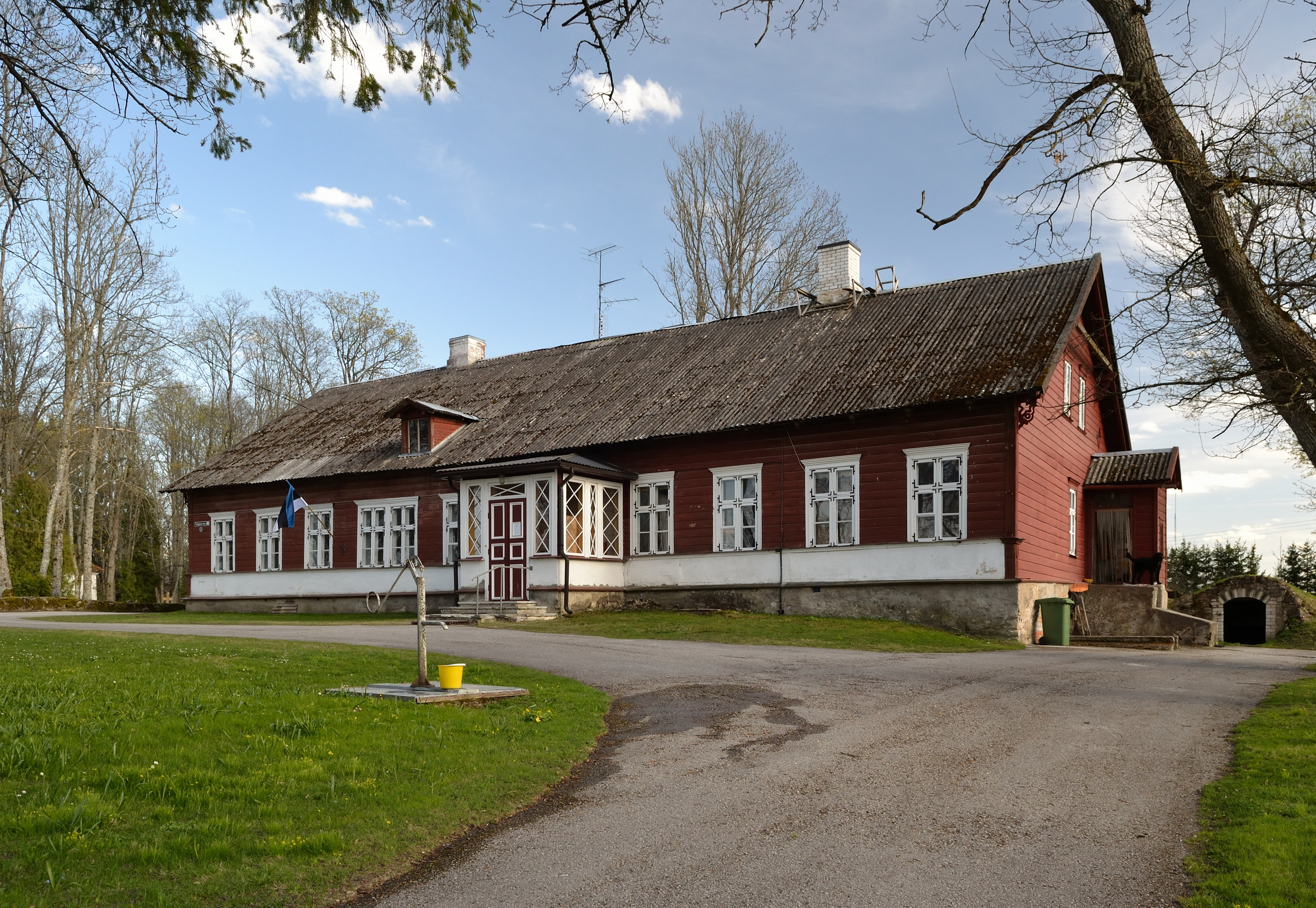
Ambla pastorate

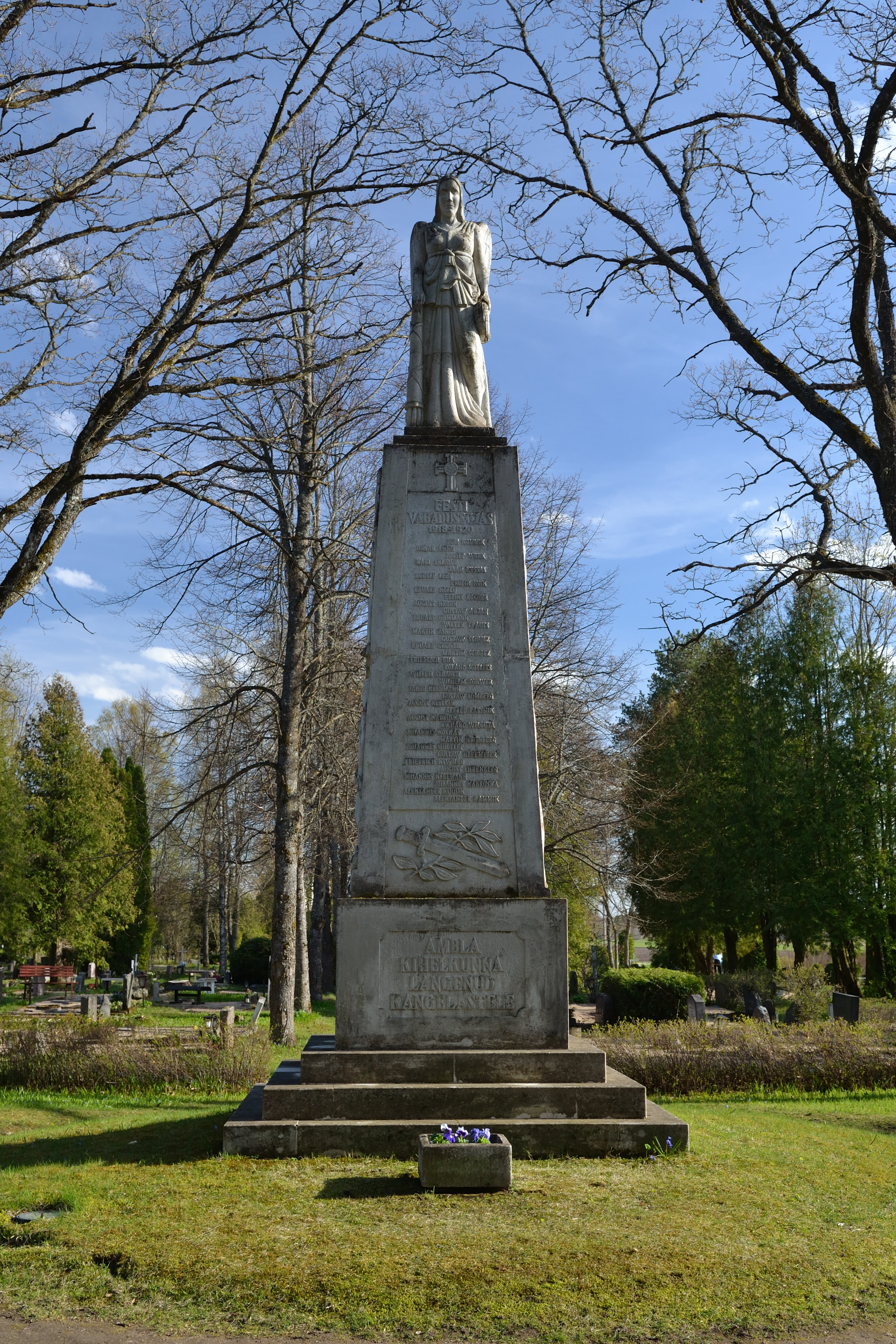
Estonian War of Independence memorial in Ambla churchyard

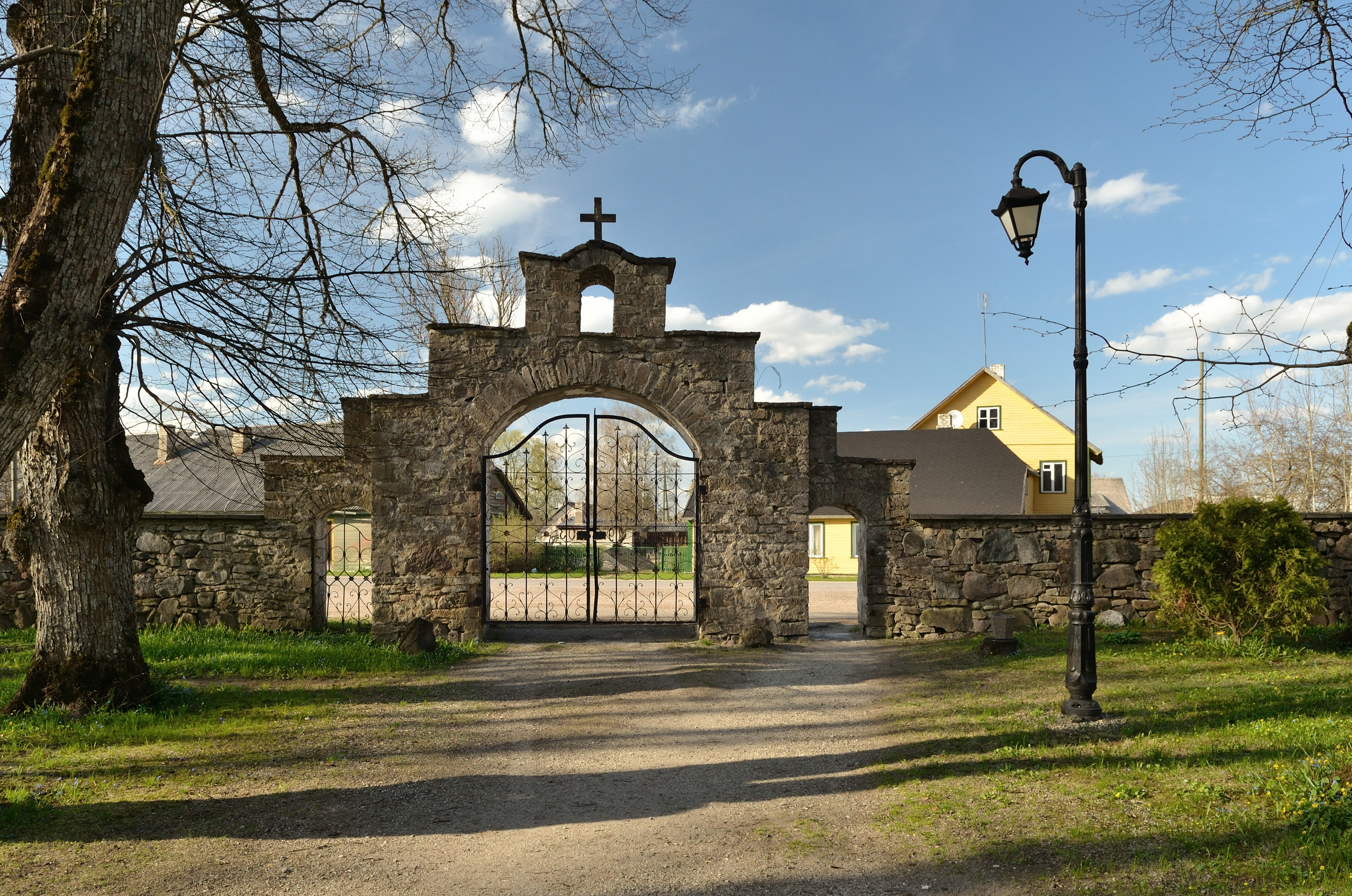
Churchyard wall with gate

== See also ==
- Ambla River
