= Lydia Mei =

Estonian artist

- Self portrait
- Born: July 2, 1896; Liepāja, Courland Governorate, Russian Empire
- Died: September 14, 1965 (aged 69); Tallinn, then part of Estonian SSR, Soviet Union
- Known for: Painting
- Movement: New Objectivity
- Spouse: Anton Starkopf

Lydia Mei (2 July 1896 – 14 September 1965) was an Estonian artist who specialized in watercolors.

Born in Liepāja, in the Courland Governorate of the Russian Empire (now Latvia), Lydia Mei was the middle child of the three daughters of the Estonian navigator and hydrographer Johan Mey, who was born in Hiiumaa. All three sisters became artists: Lydia Mei and Natalie Mei achieved public prominence during the Neue Sachlichkeit (New Objectivity) period of Estonian art of the 1920s, and their sister Kristine Mei became a sculptor.

Mei studied architecture at the Petrograd Women's Polytechnic Institute until 1918. However, she became prominent as a watercolorist in the late 1920s. She married the sculptor Anton Starkopf and is occasionally cited with the name Lydia Mei-Starkopf. She died in 1965 in the capital city of Tallinn.
