= Natalie Mei =

Estonian painter

Natalie Johanna Mei
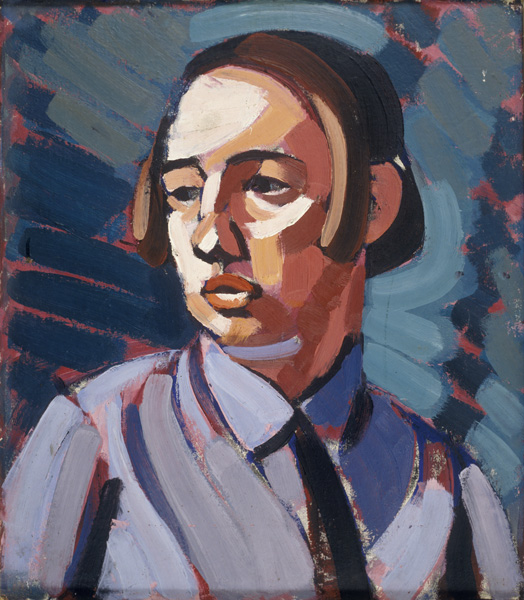
- Portrait of Natalie Mei (1923) by Kuno Veeber
- Born: January 10, 1900; Liepāja, Courland Governorate, Russian Empire
- Died: July 29, 1975 (aged 75); Tallinn, then part of Estonian SSR, Soviet Union
- Known for: Painting
- Movement: New Objectivity

Natalie Johanna Mei (10 January 1900 – 29 July 1975) was an Estonian painter and graphic artist.

Born in Liepāja, in the Courland Governorate of the Russian Empire, Natalie Mei was one of three daughters of the Estonian navigator and hydrographer Johan Mey, who was born in Hiiumaa. All three sisters became artists; Natalie and her older sister Lydia Mei achieved public prominence during the Neue Sachlichkeit (New Objectivity) period of Estonian art of the 1920s. Mei also worked as a costume designer and taught at the Tallinn Art Institute.

Mei is buried at the Rahumäe cemetery in Tallinn.
