= William Charles May =

English sculptor and painter (1853–1931)

W. C. May
- Born: William Charles May; 16 March 1853; Reading, Berkshire, England
- Died: 28 December 1931 (aged 78); Hampstead, England
- Education: Royal Academy of Arts
- Known for: Portrait painting and sculpture
- Notable work: Armada Memorial (Plaque) and bust of George V
- Patrons: Samuel Hoare MP

William Charles May (16 March 1853 – 28 December 1931) was an English sculptor and painter active from about 1870 to 1931.

He was regarded as a distinguished portrait sculptor. He studied at the Royal Academy Schools. His most famous works include his contribution to the Armada Memorial sculpture on Plymouth Hoe, a bust of king George V and painted portraits of Mr. Edmund Yates and Sarah Bernhardt.

== Early life ==
W. C. May was born in Chain Street, Reading, Berkshire, England in 1853, son of a butcher William May and Mary Ann May (nee Ball). It is said that Mary Ann was the great-grand niece of William Penn of Pennsylvania. He ran away from school and tried to join the Navy, but was refused. After that he went to work for as a butcher’s lad for Mr. Farrow, Mayor of Newbury. He then made his way to South Kensington, where he studied at the studio of Mr. Thomas Woolner R.A.. He studied for and passed the entrance exams to the Royal Academy School. While at Royal Academy School, he painted ‘A Warrior Bearing a Youth From Battle’ Later he studied with Raffaelle Monti and Jean-Baptiste Carpeaux.

== Career ==
He was contemporary of Sir Alfred Gilbert RA. and Sir William Hamo Thornycroft RA. After leaving Royal Academy School, he set up shop in Hampstead (Frederick Street and later Rudall Crescent). He cast his own bronzes. The admiralty commissioned a bust of admiral Sir William May, for which they supplied three obsolete howitzers, to be used for the sculpture. The Art Journal commissioned him to do a classical sculpture ‘The Death of Panthea’. Samuel Hoare MP was an enthusiastic patron. At about the same time he was working on the ‘Armada Memorial’, he painted ‘In Ambush’ for barrister Mr. Irwin Cox MP and later painted a portrait of him. He was a friend of Raffaelle Monti, whom he helped with trophies and cups.

== Notable works ==
Memorials etc.

- 1888 - Armada Memorial on Plymouth Hoe
- Barnes Memorial – Farnworth Park, Manchester
- Terracotta plaques – Reading Town Hall
- The Death of Panthea
- Charles S. Rolls - Motor car developer and aviator

Busts

- "Canon Pearson" in the Chapter Library of Windsor Castle
- "Lord Tollemache Of Helmingham" at the Royal Academy
- "Cardinal Vaughan" in Manchester Town Hall
- "Doctor Stevens" (Hon. Curator Of Reading Museum) in Reading Museum
- "Baron Rothschild" in Marlborough House
- "Sir H. Morice Of Middlesex Hospital"
- "Colonel North"
- "[Colonel] Fullerton"
- “Admiral Sir William May”
- "William Palmer"
- "Noel Edward Buxton"
- "J. Fuller Maitland"
- “George V”
- “Walter Besant”

Oil paintings at the Royal Academy

- "Poachers"
- "Deaf As a Post"
- "Going On A Perilous Journey"

Other works

- Sarah Bernhardt
- Edmund Yates
- "In Ambush"
- “Fresco for St. Peter’s, Belsize Park, London, England”

== Personal life ==
William Charles May was eldest son of William May (12 December 1826 – 24 December 1896) and Mary Ann Ball (1822 – 9 March 1922). Mary Ann Ball was the great-grand niece of William Penn of Pennsylvania. She lived to the old age of 100, in Sonning on Thames, Berkshire, England. He was an excellent swimmer and had, in his lifetime, rescued nine people from drowning. He was a member of the Royal Humane Society. He was married to Susan Giddens (b. 1855) and they lived, until his death in 1931, at 13 Rudall Crescent, Hampstead, London, England. They had five children: Charles Albert, George William, and three daughters, Edith, Dorothy and Phyllis.
