= Armada Memorial =

Monument in Plymouth, England

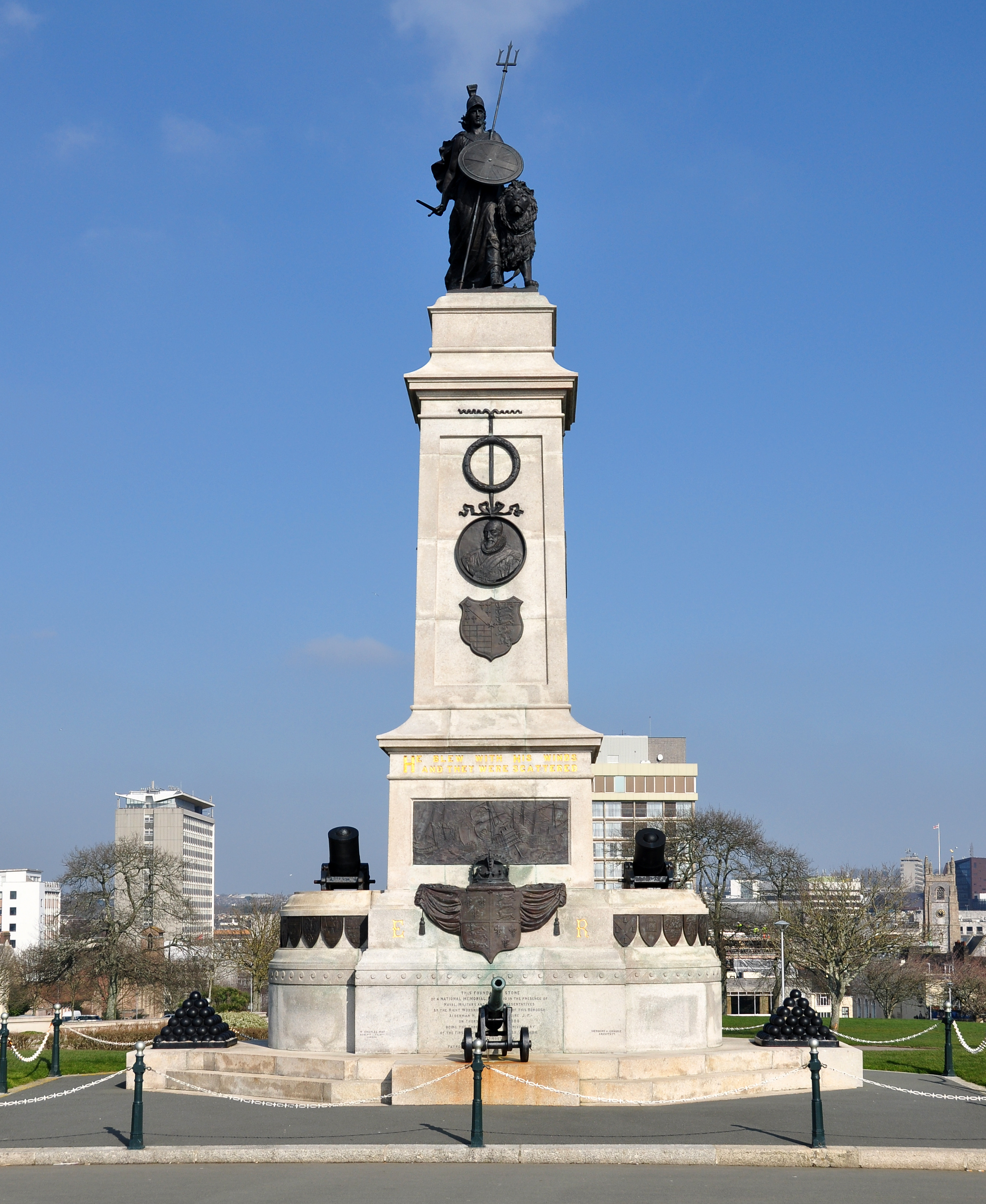
- Interactive map of Armada Memorial
- Location: Plymouth Hoe, Plymouth, Devon, England
- Coordinates: 50.3653°N 4.1416°W
- Designer: Herbert Gribble
- Material: Granite, bronze
- Completion date: 1888

Listed Building – Grade II*
- Official name: Armada Memorial
- Designated: 1 May 1975
- Reference no.: 1386461

The Armada Memorial is a monument on Plymouth Hoe in Plymouth, Devon, England. Built in 1888, the monument celebrates the tercentenary of the defeat of the Spanish Armada, which was sighted by English captains stationed in the city. It is a granite structure, decorated with bronze crests and a statue of Britannia.

== Background ==
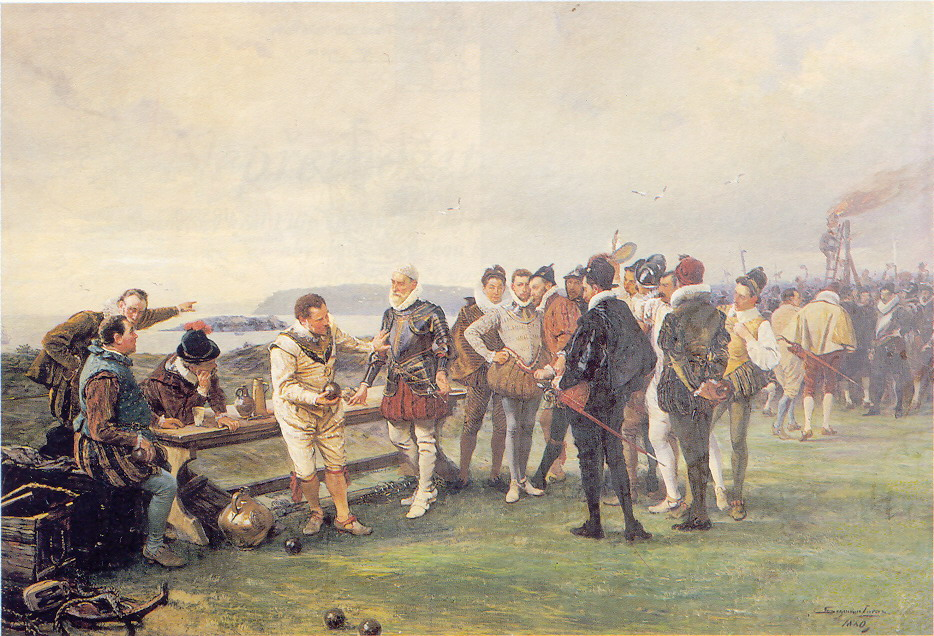
Painting by John Seymour Lucas depicting the scene on the Hoe when captains play bowls as the Spanish Armada comes into view (1880)

The Spanish Armada (or just the Armada) was a fleet that unsuccessfully attempted a naval invasion of England. News of the Armada's approach reached Plymouth on the afternoon of 19 July and it entered into sight on 20 July. Tradition recorded that tidings of the approach came to the captains whilst they were playing bowls on Plymouth Hoe. Tradition also associates the following passage from Francis Drake: "There is time enough to play the game out first, and thrash the Spaniards afterwards."

In commemoration of the defeat of the Armada, it was customary for the bells of St Andrew's to ring a merry peal annually on the Saturday night preceding 25 July. This practice ended in the 19th century. A statue of Francis Drake was erected on the Hoe in 1884.

== History ==
The foundation stone of the Armada Memorial was laid on 19 July 1888, by the Mayor of Plymouth, Henry Waring. The day was taken to celebrate the tercentenary of the first sighting of the Armada from the Hoe, but Richard Worth notes that this was actually on the 20 July. Excursion trains were run and crowds gathered for the ceremony, which was marked as a public holiday and banquet at the city's Guildhall. The memorial was inaugurated by the then Duke of Edinburgh, Alfred on 21 October 1890, with full civic pomp and imposing naval and military demonstration. The memorial became a listed building on 1 May 1975.

== Architecture ==
The memorial was made by architect Herbert Gribble and sculptor William Charles May. The monument is sculpted of granite which frequently uses entablature and features sculptures and fittings made of bronze. The base of the monument has steps and is octagonal in shape with cannonballs on the left and right and a cannon in the front. This supports an upper base with inscribed foundation stones on the front and back, above which are decorated with crowned arms and drapes in bronze. On the front (south) side is the arms of Queen Elizabeth and her royal initials "ER", while on the back (north) side is the arms of Queen Victoria and her royal initials "VR". On the west and east sides round the base are smaller bronze arms of the cities and towns which contributed to the defence of the country in 1588. Above this upper base, a square plinth with two bronze reliefs stands between two bronze mortars. The relief on the front side (above Queen Elizabeth's arms) shows the battle of the Armada under the inscription "HE BLEW WITH HIS WINDS AND THEY WERE SCATTERED", and the relief on the back side (above Queen Victoria's arms) shows Royal Naval ships at the time of the Memorial's construction under the inscription "ENGLAND EXPECTS THAT EVERY MAN WILL DO HIS DUTY". The tall plinth stands above the square plinth, on each side of which there is a bronze medallion under a wreath depicting the image of one of the English commanders of the battle with his arms underneath: Lord Howard of Effingham on the south (front), Sir Francis Drake on the north (back), Sir John Hawkins on the west, and Lord Henry Seymour on the east. (Note: The images can be identified by the respective arms beneath them, which can be seen in a brochure about the tercentenary celebration of the battle of Armada in 1988. The image of the Duke of Medina Sidonia is not among them.) On top of the monument stands the bronze statue of Britannia (a female personification of Great Britain) holding a trident, a shield bearing the Union Flag and a sword with a lion by her side. A series of cast-iron stanchions with chains act as a perimeter fence. The stone used in the memorial was quarried in Gunnislake, Cornwall and was noted as one of the whitest known granites with a close texture (in 1897).
