= Spanish Armada =

Fleet sailing against England in 1588

- Part of the Anglo-Spanish War (1585–1604) and the Eighty Years' War
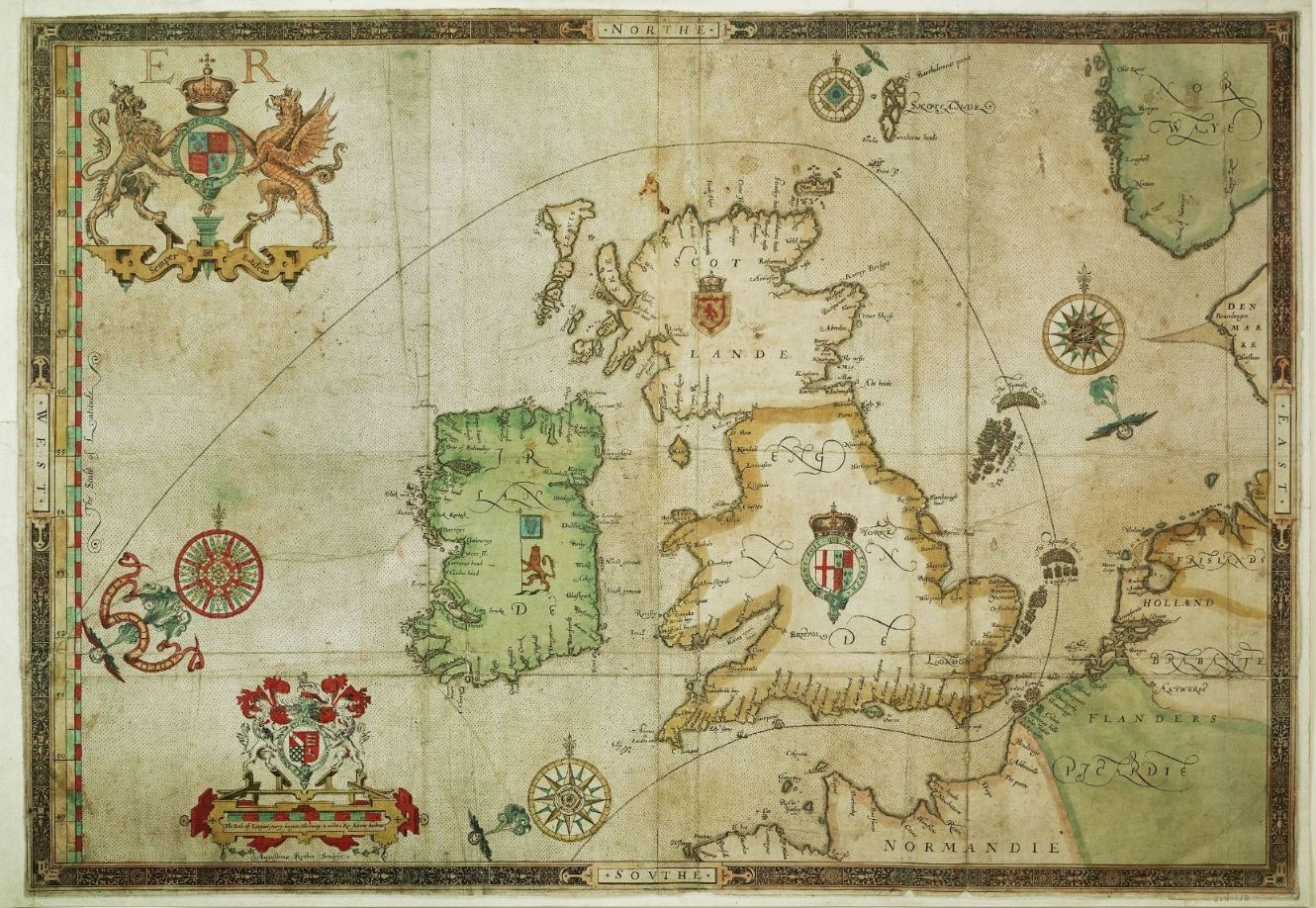
- Route of the Spanish Armada
Date	July–August 1588
Location	English Channel and the North Sea
Result	Anglo-Dutch victory

Belligerents
England; Dutch Republic	Spain; Portugal

Commanders and leaders
(Kingdom of England) Charles Howard; (Kingdom of England) Francis Drake; (Kingdom of England) John Hawkins; (Dutch Republic) Justinus van Nassau	(Spain) 7th Duke of Medina Sidonia; (Spain) Juan de Recalde †; (Spain) Miguel de Oquendo †; (Spain) Diego de Medrano †; (Spain) Pedro de Valdés (surrendered)

Strength
34 warships; 163 armed merchant vessels (30 more than 200 tons); 30 flyboats; Total: 197 ships; 16,000 men	Armada: 24 warships; 44 armed merchant vessels; 38 auxiliary vessels; 31 supply vessels; 2,431 artillery pieces; 10,138 sailors; 19,315 soldiers (90% Spaniards, 10% Portuguese); Spanish Netherlands: 31,800 soldiers; 170 barges; Total: 55,000 men; 137 ships

Casualties and losses
English Channel actions: No ships lost; Battle of Gravelines: 50–100 dead; 400 wounded; 8 fireships burnt (Note: a letter from Wynter to Walsyngham indicates that the ships used as fire-ships were drawn from those at hand in the fleet and not hulks from Dover.); Disease: 2,000–3,000 dead	English Channel actions: 2 galleons captured; 397 captured; Battle of Gravelines: More than 600 dead; 800 wounded; Five ships sunk or captured; Overall: c. 44 ships lost(10 scuttled); 11,000–20,000 dead

The Spanish Armada (often known as Invincible Armada, or the Enterprise of England, Spanish: Grande y Felicísima Armada, lit. 'Great and Most Fortunate Navy') was a Spanish fleet that sailed from Lisbon in late May 1588, and was the largest engagement of the undeclared Anglo-Spanish War. The Armada was commanded by Alonso de Guzmán, Duke of Medina Sidonia, an aristocrat appointed by Philip II of Spain. His orders were to sail up the English Channel, join with the army of Alexander Farnese, Duke of Parma in Flanders, and escort an invasion force that would land in England and overthrow Elizabeth I. Its purpose was to reinstate Catholicism in England, end English support for the Dutch Republic in the north and prevent attacks by English and Dutch privateers against Spanish interests in the Americas.

The Spanish were opposed by an English fleet based in Plymouth. Faster and more manoeuvrable than the larger Spanish galleons, its ships were able to attack the armada as it sailed up the Channel. Several subordinates advised Medina Sidonia first to enter Plymouth Sound and attack the English fleet before it could leave harbour and then to anchor in the Solent and occupy the Isle of Wight, but he refused to deviate from his instructions to join with Parma. Although the armada reached Calais largely intact, while awaiting communication from Parma, it was attacked at night by English fire ships and forced to scatter. The armada suffered further losses in the ensuing Battle of Gravelines and was in danger of running aground on the Dutch coast when the wind changed, allowing it to escape into the North Sea. Pursued by the English, the Spanish ships returned home via Scotland and Ireland. Up to 24 ships were wrecked along the way before the rest managed to get home. Among the factors contributing to the defeat and withdrawal of the armada were bad weather conditions and the better employment of naval guns and battle tactics by the English.

The following year, England organized a similar large-scale campaign against Spain, known as the "English Armada", and sometimes called the "counter-armada of 1589", which failed. Three further Spanish armadas were sent against England and Ireland in 1596, 1597, and 1601, but these likewise ended in failure.

== Etymology ==
The word armada is from Spanish: armada, which is cognate with English army. It is originally derived from Latin: armātae, the past participle of armāre, 'to arm', used in Romance languages as a noun for armed force, army, navy, fleet. Armada Española is still the Spanish term for the modern Spanish Navy.

== Background ==
England had been strategically in alliance with Spain for many decades prior to England and Spain entering into war. In the mid to late 15th century, France under Louis XI was the strongest power in western Europe. England still had possessions in what today is called Northern France, and Spain was under constant threat. Henry VII of England therefore formed a strategic relationship with Ferdinand II, of Spain. Whilst the threat from France remained, England and Spain enjoyed many decades of peace which included a number of strategic marriages to retain the alliance. There were many causes of jealousy between the two royal houses over the years, but the French Wars of Religion were the ultimate cause of the alliance breaking between Philip II of Spain and Elizabeth I, and this led to war between the two countries.

By the mid sixteenth century Habsburg Spain under Philip II was a dominant political and military power in Europe, with a global empire which became the source of her wealth. It championed the Catholic cause and its global possessions stretched from Europe, the Americas and to the Philippines. This was expanded further in 1580 when Philip gained control of Portugal thus forming the Iberian Union. Philip became the first monarch who ruled over an empire upon which the sun did not set, and he did so from his chambers in the Escorial Palace by means of written communication.

In comparison, England was only a minor European power with no empire and had little influence overseas. During Henry VIII's reign, England had gone to war three times against France in alliance with Spain. The last of these conflicts was the Sieges of Boulogne (1544–1546).

Henry VIII began the English Reformation as a political exercise over his desire to divorce his first wife, Catherine of Aragon. Over time, England became increasingly aligned with the Protestant reformation taking place in Europe, especially during the reign of Henry's son, Edward VI but Edward died childless, and his Catholic half-sister Mary ascended the throne in 1553. Three years later Mary married Philip II, becoming queen consort of Spain. Mary returned England to the Catholic Church; during her reign more than 260 English Protestants were burned at the stake, earning her the nickname "Bloody Mary".

In 1557, Philip persuaded Mary to enter into a disastrous war against France. England landed forces in the Low Countries and with the failing support of Spain, won the Battle of St. Quentin. Though this brought victory for Spain, England had neglected her defences in France, and France took Calais in 1558. Thus England lost her last possession in France, which she had held for over 200 years. This was undoubtedly a huge blow to Mary's prestige, who is reported as stating "When I am dead and opened, you shall find 'Calais' lying in my heart." England's wealth further suffered, not just from the cost of the war, but also from the reduced revenues from alum and the Antwerp cloth trade, caused by the loss of the port. The Kingdom of Spain had strengthened its hold on the Low Countries, weakening France with no cost to itself, but at great cost to England. Just before Mary's death, Philip and Mary's half-sister Elizabeth looked to come to an alliance and settlement between England and Spain, and there is evidence even marriage between Philip and Elizabeth was explored, but the question of faith, and the unequal relationship between the two Kingdoms made this extremely unlikely. Spain and England had remained in an alliance that had lasted for over 70 years.

=== Elizabethan period ===
Mary died in 1558, succeeded by her half-sister as Elizabeth I, a Protestant. Elizabeth re-implemented Edward's reforms. Also, in the eyes of the Catholic Church, Henry had never officially divorced Catherine, making Elizabeth illegitimate. Philip therefore deemed Elizabeth a heretic and usurper. Philip supported plots to have Elizabeth overthrown in favour of her Catholic cousin and heir presumptive, Mary, Queen of Scots. These plans were thwarted in 1566–1567, when Mary was forced to abdicate the crown of Scotland in favour of her son James VI, and then was imprisoned by Elizabeth.

Friction between England and Spain continued. English smugglers traded in Spanish colonies and English privateers seized Spanish ships. Elizabeth even established an alliance with Morocco. In 1579, a small fleet including three Spanish ships was sent to Ireland to support the Second Desmond Rebellion against English rule. These were followed by further ships in 1580. The rebellion failed with the Siege of Smerwick, after which five to six hundred surrendering Spanish, Irish and Papal troops were massacred by English forces.

The first documented proposal for the Enterprise of England was made in August 1583. Admiral Álvaro de Bazán, Marquis of Santa Cruz, flushed with pride of his victory in the Azores, suggested to Philip II that Spain take advantage of the victory to attack England. In 1585, the Anglo-Spanish War began. English privateers attacked Spanish fishing boats on the Grand Banks and raided Spanish colonies, (Note: Hart describes a large privateer fleet of 25 ships commanded by Drake in 1585 that raided about the Spanish Caribbean colonies.) and England sent troops to support the Dutch revolt against Spain. Elizabeth finally had Mary executed in February 1587, due to constant plots in Mary's name.

Opposing monarchs
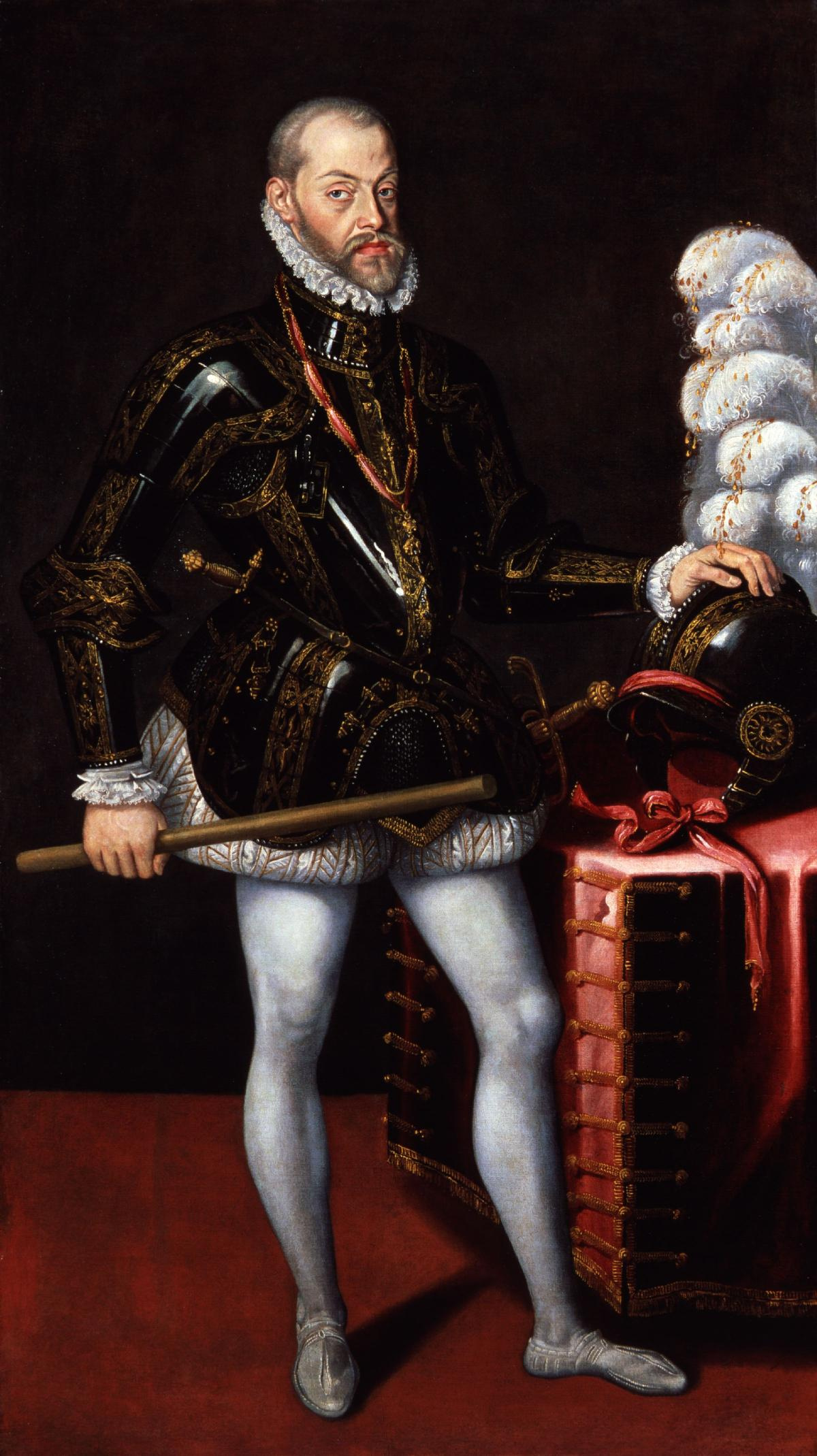
Philip II of Spain c. 1580, National Portrait Gallery, London

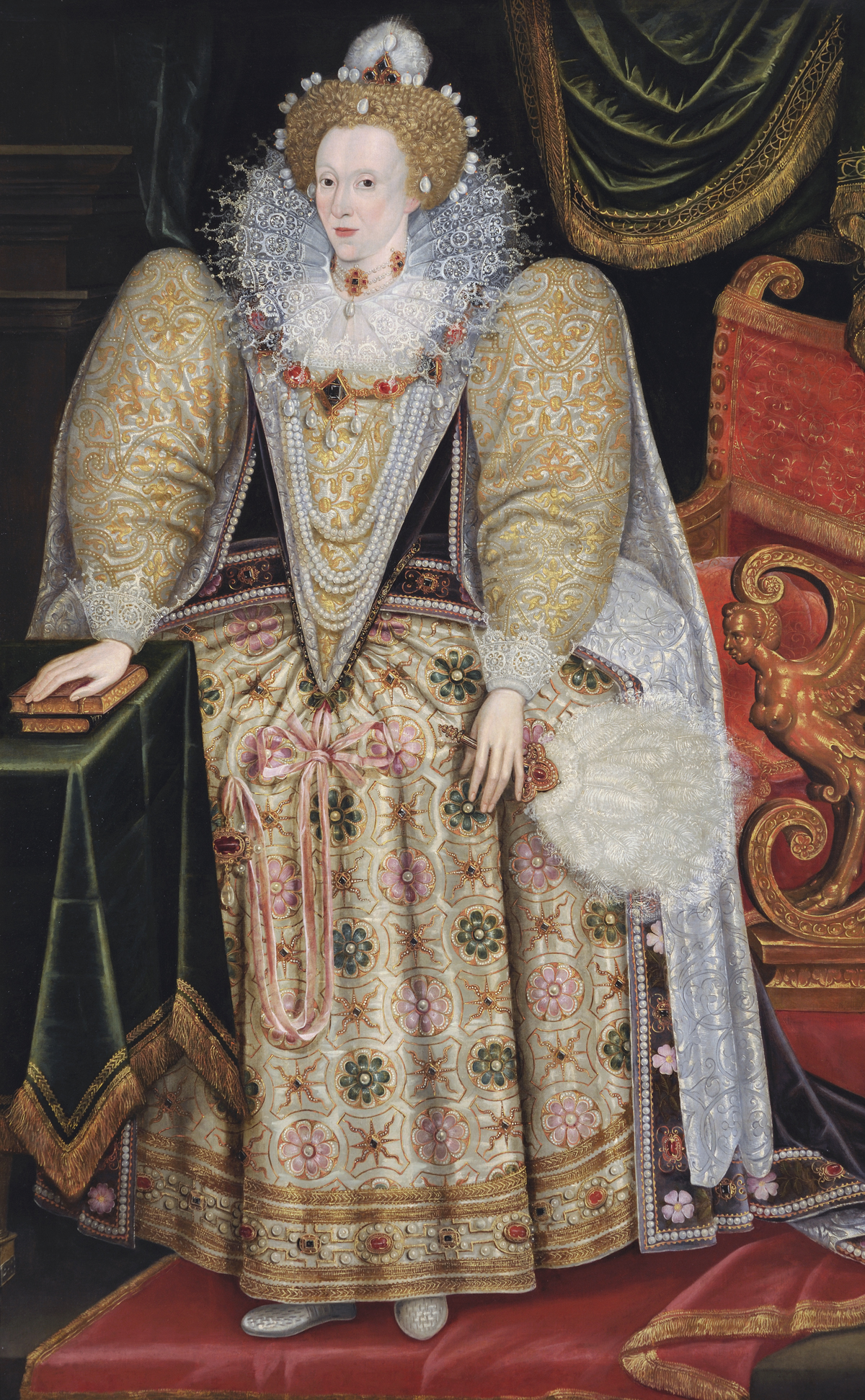
Queen Elizabeth I c. 1585, Trinity College, Cambridge

In retaliation, Philip planned an expedition to invade England to overthrow Elizabeth, or if the armada was not entirely successful, at least obtain freedom of worship for English Catholics and indemnity for English attacks.

The Marquis of Santa Cruz had originally drawn up plans in 1586 to invade England with an army from Spain. The requirements proved to be astronomical: 94,222 men, and 556 ships of all sizes to carry them and victuals for eight months. The cost would be more than 1.5 billion maravedis, clearly beyond even Spain's resources. Philip then formed a more realistic plan: a fleet sailing from Spain would transport Parma's army from the Low Countries to England.

If the Armada is not as successful as we hoped but yet not entirely defeated, then you may offer England peace on the following terms. The first is that in England the free use and exercise of our Holy Catholic faith shall be permitted to all Catholics, native and foreign, and that those that are in exile shall be permitted to return. The second is that all the places in my Netherlands which the English hold shall be restored to me and the third that they shall recompense me for the injury they have done me, my dominions and my subjects, which will amount to an exceeding great sum. With regard the free exercise of Catholicism, you may point out to them that since freedom of worship is permitted to the huguenots of France, there will be no sacrifice of dignity in allowing the same privilege to Catholics in England.

— Philip II to the Duke of Parma, April 1588

If the expedition succeeded, it would end English support for the Dutch and English attacks on Spanish ships and colonies. Philip was supported by Pope Sixtus V, who treated the invasion as a crusade, with the promise of a subsidy should the Armada make land. (Note: ...the widespread suffering and irritation caused by the religious wars Elizabeth fomented, and the indignation caused by her religious persecution, and the execution of Mary Stuart, caused Catholics everywhere to sympathize with Spain and to regard the Armada as a crusade against the most dangerous enemy of the faith", and "Pope Sixtus V agreed to renew the excommunication of the Queen, and to grant a large subsidy to the Armada but, given the time needed for preparation and actual sailing of the fleet, would give nothing until the expedition should land in England. In this way, he eventually was saved the million crowns, and did not take any proceedings against the heretic queen.") Substantial support for the invasion was also expected from English Catholics, including wealthy and influential aristocrats and traders.

A raid on Cádiz, led by privateer Francis Drake in April 1587, captured or destroyed about 30 ships and great quantities of supplies, setting preparations back by a year. Elizabeth's security chief and spymaster, Sir Francis Walsingham, urged her ambassador to the Ottoman Empire, William Harborne, to get the Ottomans to distract the Spaniards with fleet manoeuvres, but there is no evidence for the success of that plan.

Parma was initially consulted by Philip II in 1583. Parma stressed that three conditions would need to be met to achieve success; absolute secrecy, secure possession and defence of the Dutch provinces, and keep the French from interfering either with a peace agreement or by sowing division between the Catholic League and the Huguenots. Secrecy could not be maintained which made the enterprise vastly more complicated. Philip ultimately combined Parma's plan with that of Santa Cruz, initially entertaining a triple attack, starting with a diversionary raid on Scotland, while the main armada would capture either the Isle of Wight or Southampton to establish a safe anchorage in The Solent. Parma would then follow with a large army from the Low Countries crossing the English Channel.

The highly experienced Santa Cruz was appointed commander of the naval force, while Parma would command the invasion force. Unfortunately for the Spanish, Santa Cruz died in February 1588. He was replaced by the Duke of Medina Sidonia. While a competent soldier and distinguished administrator, Medina Sidonia had no naval experience. He wrote to Philip expressing grave doubts about the planned campaign, but his message was prevented from reaching the King by courtiers on the grounds that God would ensure the armada's success.

== Battle ==
=== Fleet descriptions ===
Prior to the undertaking, Pope Sixtus V allowed Philip to collect crusade taxes and granted his men indulgences. The blessing of the armada's banner on 25 April 1588, was similar to the ceremony used prior to the Battle of Lepanto in 1571. On 21 July 1588 (N.S), the armada set sail from Lisbon and headed for the English Channel. When it left Lisbon, the fleet was composed of 141 ships, with 10,138 sailors and 19,315 soldiers. There were also 1,545 non-combatants (volunteers, officers' servants, friars, artillerists etc.) The fleet carried 1,500 brass guns and 1,000 iron guns. The full body of the fleet took two days to leave port.

The armada was delayed by bad weather. Storms in the Bay of Biscay along the Galician coast forced four galleys commanded by Captain Diego de Medrano and one galleon to turn back, and other ships had to put in to A Coruña for repairs, leaving 137 ships that sailed for the English Channel. Nearly half of the ships were not built as warships and were used for duties such as scouting and dispatch work, or for carrying supplies, animals and troops. The armada included 24 purpose-built warships, 44 armed merchantmen, 38 auxiliary vessels and 34 supply ships.

In the Spanish Netherlands, Parma had mustered a polyglot army of 60,583 soldiers; Spanish, Italians, Burgundians, Irish, Scottish, Walloon and German, with 3650 cavalry. He ordered hundreds of flyboats to be built to carry them across the channel (Note: Martin & Parker give 30,500 and raised to 30,000 infantry and 2,000 cavalry Also, the hoax paper The English Mercurie published by Authoritie, Whitehall 23 July 1588, Imprinted at London by Chriss Barker, Her Highness's Printer, 1588, otherwise states fairly accurately, p. 3, "all the Spanish troops in the Netherlands, and consists of thirty thousand Foot and eighteen hundred Horse.") while awaiting the arrival of the armada. Since the element of surprise was long gone, the new plan was to use the cover of the warships to convey the army on barges to a place near London. In all, 55,000 men were to have been mustered, a huge army for that time. On the day the armada set sail, Elizabeth's ambassador in the Netherlands, Valentine Dale, met Parma's representatives in peace negotiations. The English made a vain effort to intercept the armada in the Bay of Biscay. On 6 July, negotiations were abandoned, and the English fleet stood prepared, if ill-supplied, at Plymouth, awaiting news of Spanish movements.

Only 122 ships from the Spanish fleet entered the Channel; the four galleys, one nao, five pataches and the 10 Portuguese caravels had left the fleet before the first encounter with the English fleet. An additional 5 pataches, dispatched to deliver messages to Parma, should be deducted which brings the number to 117 Spanish ships facing the roughly 226-strong English fleet. The Spanish fleet outgunned that of the English with 50% more available firepower than the English. The English fleet consisted of the 34 ships of the Royal Fleet, 21 of which were galleons of 200 to 400 tons, and 163 other ships, 30 of which were of 200 to 400 tons and carried up to 42 guns each. Twelve of the ships were privateers owned by Lord Howard of Effingham, John Hawkins and Sir Francis Drake.

In the beginning of June, Parma had sent Captain Moresin with some pilots to Admiral Sedonia. Upon Moresin's return on 22 June, the report he made to Parma caused him distress. Medina Sedonia was under the impression that Parma could simply sail out into the channel with his barges filled with troops. Parma had continually informed the king that his passage to the channel was blocked by English and Dutch ships, and the only way he could bring his boats out was if the armada cleared the blockade.

The fleet was sighted in England on 29 July (N.S), when it appeared off the Lizard in Cornwall. The news was conveyed to London by a system of beacons that had been constructed along the south coast. The same day the English fleet was trapped in Plymouth Harbour by the incoming tide. The Spanish convened a council of war, where it was proposed to ride into the harbour on the tide and incapacitate the defending ships at anchor. From Plymouth Harbour the Spanish would attack England, but Philip explicitly forbade Medina Sidonia from engaging, leaving the armada to sail on to the east and towards the Isle of Wight. As the tide turned, 55 English ships set out to confront the armada from Plymouth under the command of Lord Howard of Effingham, with Sir Francis Drake as vice admiral. The rear admiral was John Hawkins.

=== Action off Plymouth ===
On 30 July, the English fleet was off Eddystone Rocks with the armada upwind to the west. To execute its attack, the English tacked upwind of the armada, thus gaining the weather gage, a significant advantage. At daybreak on 31 July, the English fleet engaged the armada off Plymouth near the Eddystone Rocks. The armada was in a crescent-shaped defensive formation, convex towards the east. The galleons and great ships were concentrated in the centre and at the tips of the crescent's horns, giving cover to the transports and supply ships in between. Opposing them, the English were in two sections, with Drake to the north in Revenge with 11 ships, and Howard to the south in Ark Royal with the bulk of the fleet.

Given the Spanish advantage in close-quarter fighting, the English kept beyond grappling range and bombarded the Spanish ships from a distance with cannon fire. The distance was too great for the manoeuvre to be effective and, at the end of the first day's fighting neither fleet had lost a ship in action. The English caught up with the Spanish fleet after a day of sailing.

The Spanish fleet off the coast of Cornwall on 29 July 1588 (N.S.)

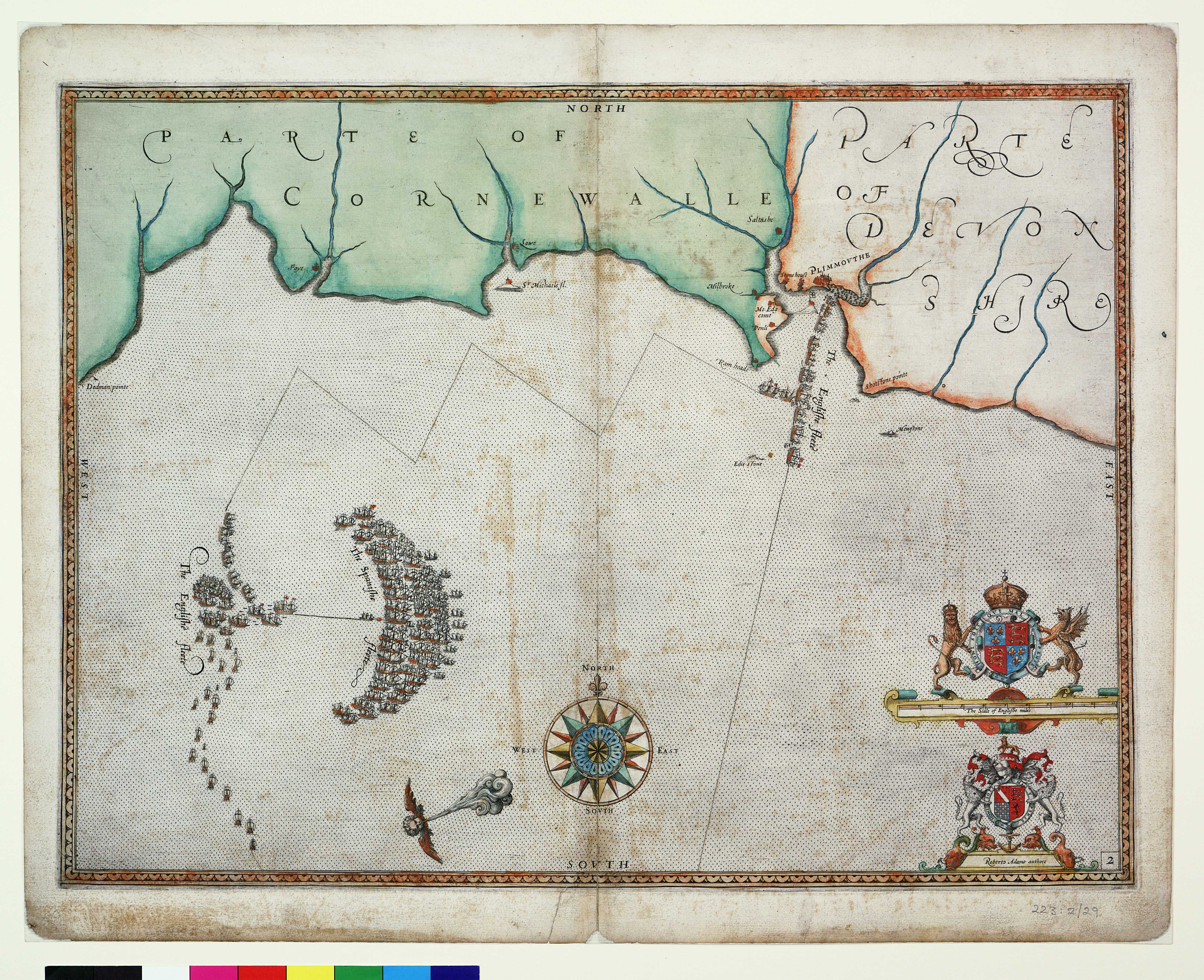
The Spanish and English fleets near Plymouth on 30–31 July 1588 (N.S.)

The English engage the Spanish fleet near Plymouth on 31 July 1588 (N.S)

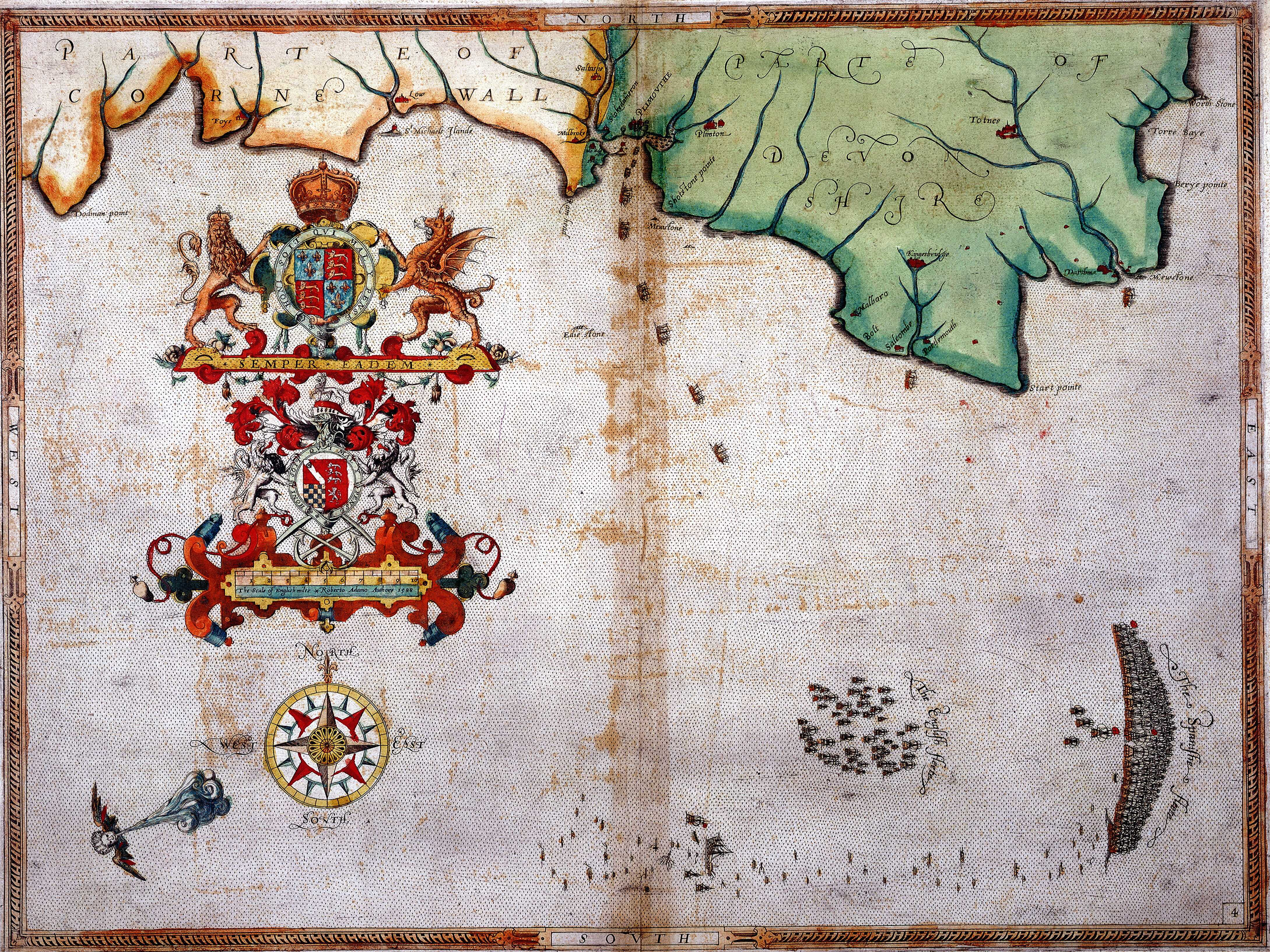
The English pursue the Spanish fleet east of Plymouth on 31 July – 1 August 1588 (N.S.)

=== Actions off Portland Bill and Isle of Wight ===
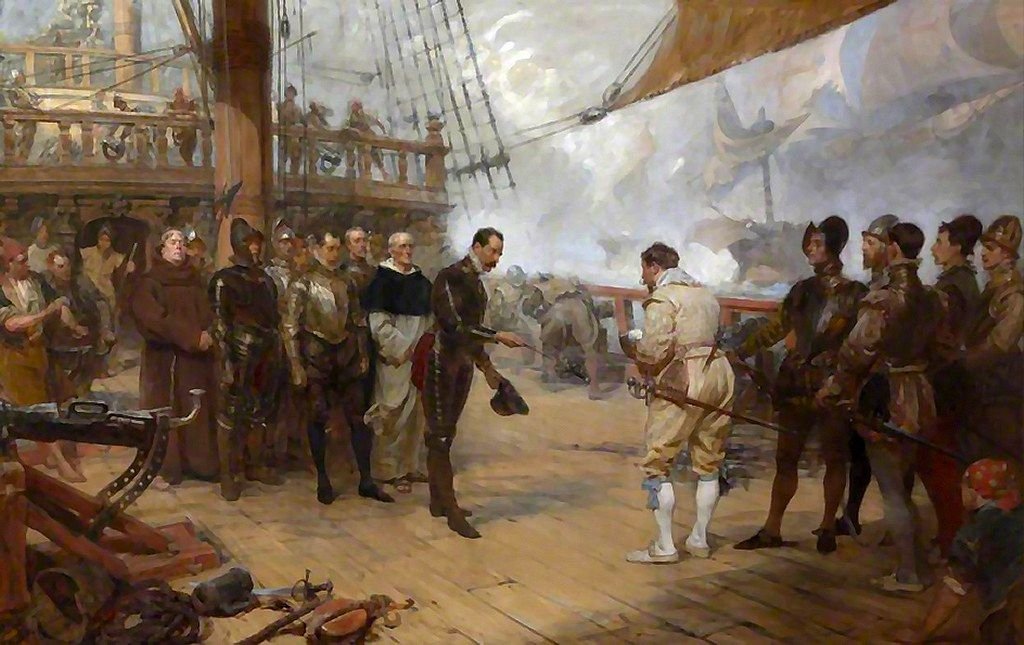
The Surrender of Pedro de Valdés (commander of the Squadron of Andalusia) to Francis Drake aboard the Revenge during the attack of the Spanish Armada, 1588, by John Seymour Lucas

The English fleet and the armada engaged once more on 1 August, off Portland. A change of wind gave the Spanish the weather gage, and they sought to close with the English, but were foiled by the smaller ships' greater manoeuvrability. While the Spanish centre manoeuvred to support the Santa Ana, the Nuestra Señora del Rosario collided with a number of ships, losing her bowsprit and setting in motion a series of mishaps. She began to drift, and was taken off by the current in the opposite direction to the fleet and closer to the English. Drake in the Revenge sailed to the Rosario during the night and she was taken in action; Admiral Pedro de Valdés (commander of the Squadron of Andalusia) surrendered along with his entire crew. On board, the English seized supplies of much-needed gunpowder and 50,000 gold ducats. Drake had been guiding the English fleet by means of a lantern, which he snuffed out to slip away from the Spanish ships, causing the rest of his fleet to become scattered and disarrayed by dawn. At one point, Howard formed his ships into a line of battle to attack at close range, bringing all his guns to bear, but he did not follow through with the manoeuvre and little was achieved. During a lull in battle, San Salvador's gunpowder magazine exploded, perhaps as a result of sabotage by a disgruntled gunner, setting a portion of the ship on fire. The Spanish attempted to scuttle the ship, but this failed when the Golden Hind came up. The Spanish evacuated the vessel and the Golden Hind promptly captured her.

If the armada could create a temporary base in the protected waters of the Solent, the strait separating the Isle of Wight from the English mainland, it could wait there for word from Parma's army; Parma did not get news of this until 6 August. However, in a full-scale attack, the English fleet broke into four groups with Martin Frobisher of the ship Aid given command over a squadron, and Drake coming with a large force from the south. Medina Sidonia sent reinforcements south and ordered the Armada back to open sea to avoid the Owers shoals. There were no other secure harbours further east along England's south coast, so the Armada was compelled to make for Calais, without being able to wait for word of Parma's army.

Starting on 1 August, Sidonia began sending Parma messages detailing his position and movements. However, couriers landed on the French shore or despatched in small vessels could make their way to Parma little faster than the armada itself. It was not until 5 August that Parma received the first report from the Admiral.

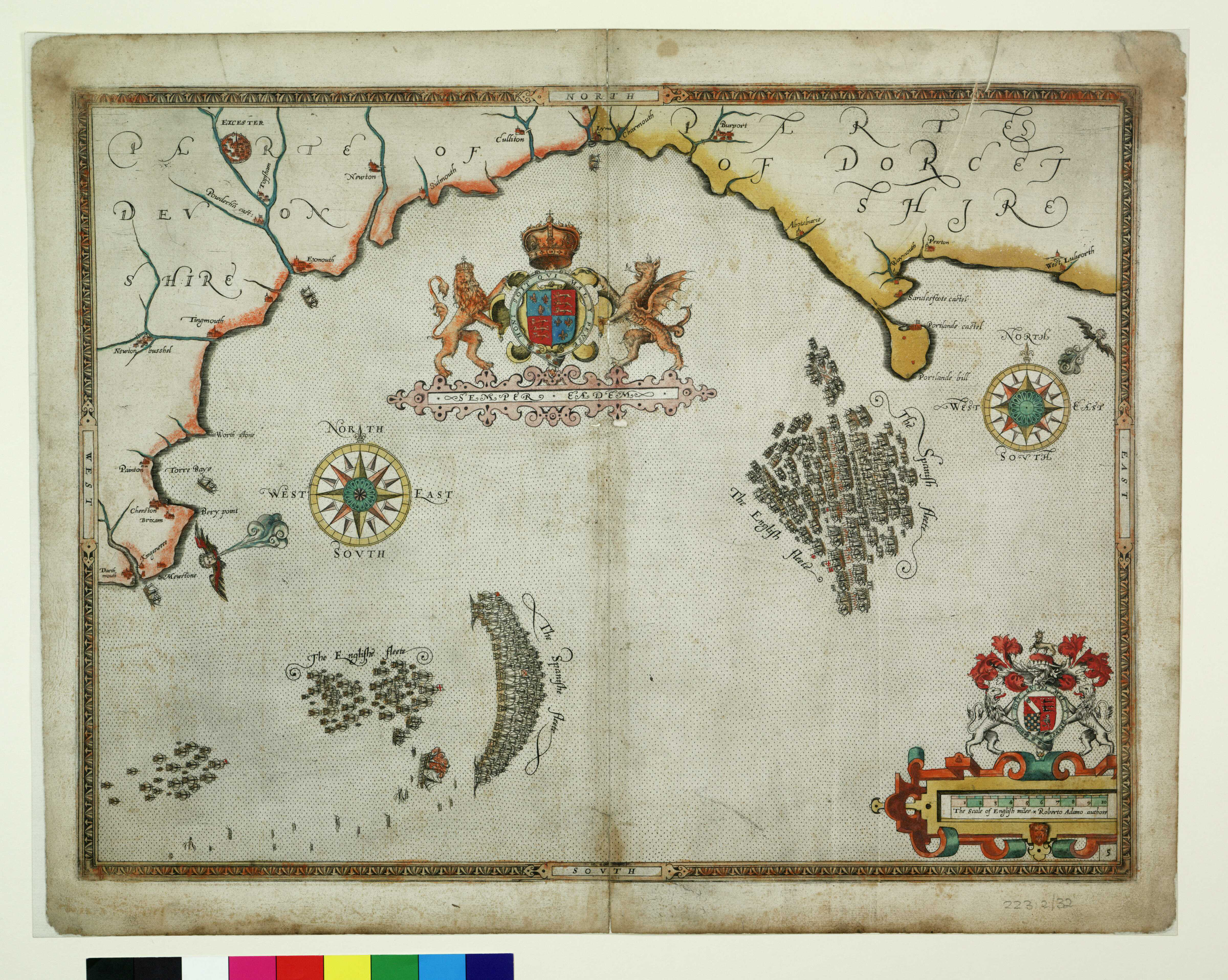
The English and Spanish fleets on 1–2 August 1588 (N.S.)

The English and Spanish fleets between Portland Bill and the Isle of Wight on 2–3 August 1588 (N.S.)

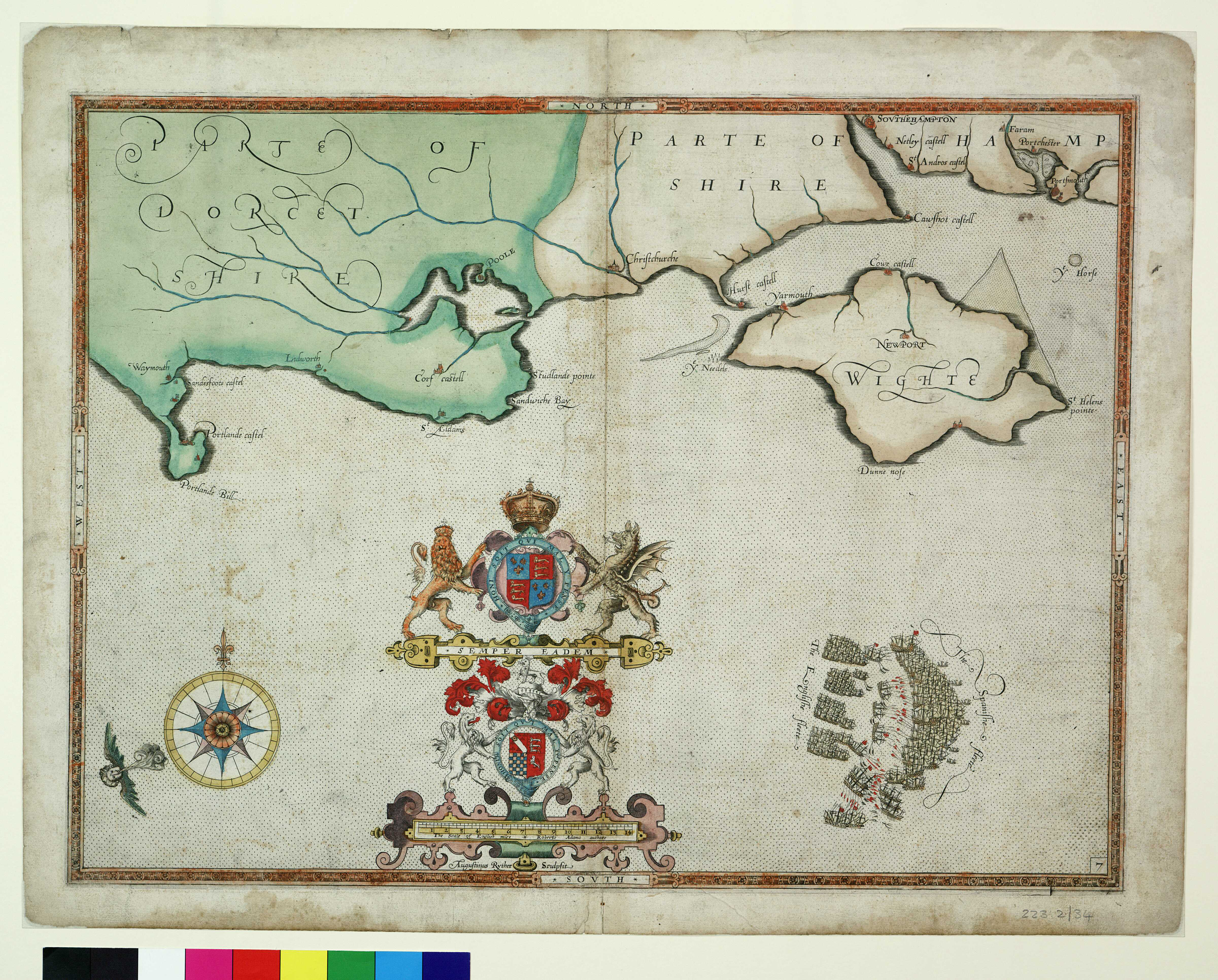
The battle off the Isle of Wight on 4 August 1588 (N.S.)

=== Fireships at Calais ===
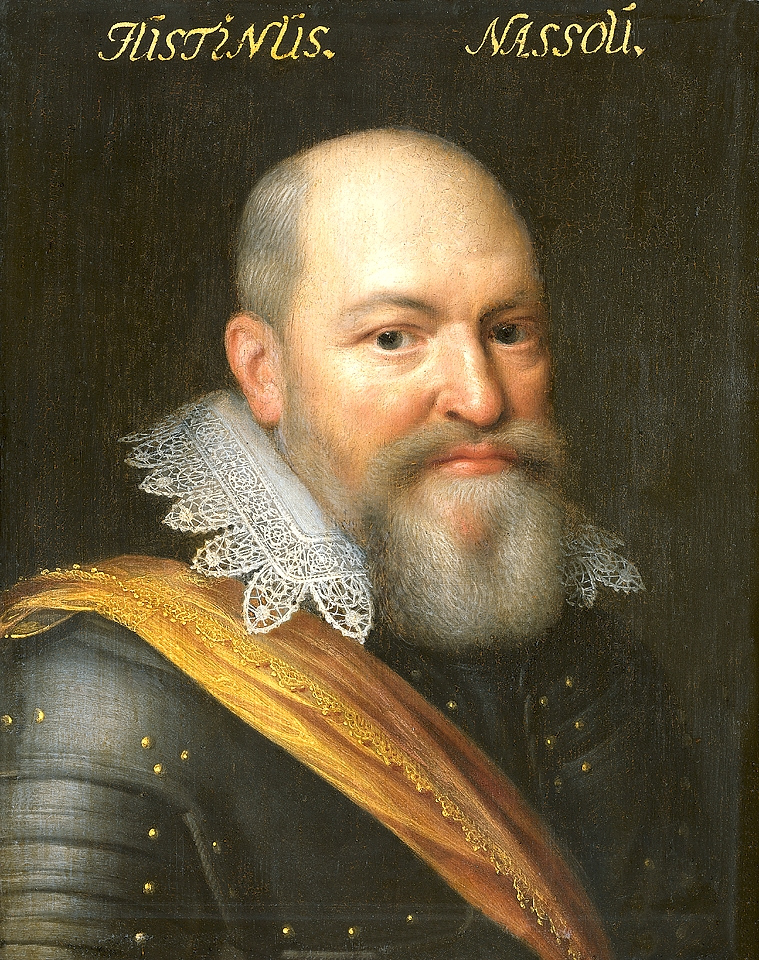
Justinus van Nassau

On 7 August, the armada anchored off Calais in a tightly packed defensive crescent formation, not far from Dunkirk (Parma only learned of this on that same afternoon) where Parma's army, reduced by disease to 16,000, was expected to be waiting, ready to join the fleet in barges sent from ports along the Flemish coast. An essential element of the plan of invasion, as it was eventually implemented, was the transportation of a large part of Parma's Army of Flanders as the main invasion force in unarmed barges across the English Channel. These barges would be protected by the large ships of the armada. However, to get to the armada, they would have to cross the zone dominated by the Dutch navy, where the armada could not go due to the ongoing Eighty Years' War with the Dutch Republic. This problem seems to have been overlooked by the armada's commanders, but it was insurmountable. Communication was more difficult than anticipated, and word came too late that Parma's army had yet to be equipped with sufficient transport or to be assembled in the port, a process that would take at least six days. As Medina Sidonia waited at anchor, Dunkirk was blockaded by a Dutch fleet of 30 flyboats under Lieutenant-Admiral Justinus van Nassau. The Dutch flyboats mainly operated in the shallow waters off Zeeland and Flanders where larger warships with a deeper draught, like the Spanish and English galleons, could not safely enter. Parma expected the armada to send its light pataches to drive away the Dutch, but Medina Sidonia would not send them because he feared he would need these ships for his own protection. There was no deep-water port where the fleet might shelter, which had been acknowledged as a major difficulty for the expedition, and the Spanish found themselves vulnerable as night drew on.

The Dutch enjoyed an unchallenged naval advantage in these waters, even though their navy was inferior in naval armament. Because Medina Sidonia did not attempt to break the Dutch blockade and Parma would not risk attempting the passage unescorted, the Army of Flanders escaped the trap that Van Nassau had in mind for them.

Late on 7 August, Howard was reinforced by a squadron under Lord Edward Seymour and William Wynter, which had been stationed in the Downs as a reinforcement for the Dutch should Parma make any independent move. Their arrival gave Howard a total of 140 ships. He also received a small amount of powder and shot, which the Earl of Sussex had collected from fortresses and garrisons on the South Coast, and some victuals.

The wind and currents were favourable for an attempt to break the armada's formation by sending fireships against it. Walsingham had already sent orders to Dover that fishing smacks and faggots and pitch were to be collected for this purpose. However, the English commanders felt that they could not wait for proper fireships and therefore sacrificed eight of their own warships. Drake, who was a substantial shipowner, offered one of his own ships, the 200-ton "Thomas". Hawkins also offered one of his ships, the 150-ton "Bark Bond". Six other ships, of between 90 and 200 tons, were volunteered. These ships were filled with whatever pitch, brimstone and tar was immediately available. Because of the haste, the loaded guns and stores were left aboard.

In the middle of the night of 7–8 August, the English set these fireships alight and cast them downwind among the closely anchored vessels of the armada. The Spanish feared that these uncommonly large fireships were "hellburners", specialised fireships filled with large gunpowder charges that had been used to deadly effect at the Siege of Antwerp. Three were intercepted by pataches and towed away, but the remainder bore down on the fleet. Medina Sidonia's flagship and the principal warships held their positions, but the rest of the fleet cut their anchor cables and scattered in confusion. No Spanish ships were burnt, but the crescent formation had been broken, and the fleet found itself too far leeward of Calais in the rising southwesterly wind to recover its position. Another loss, the effect of which would not be felt until later, was almost every anchor the Armada's ships possessed. The English closed in for battle. Parma learned of this the following day.

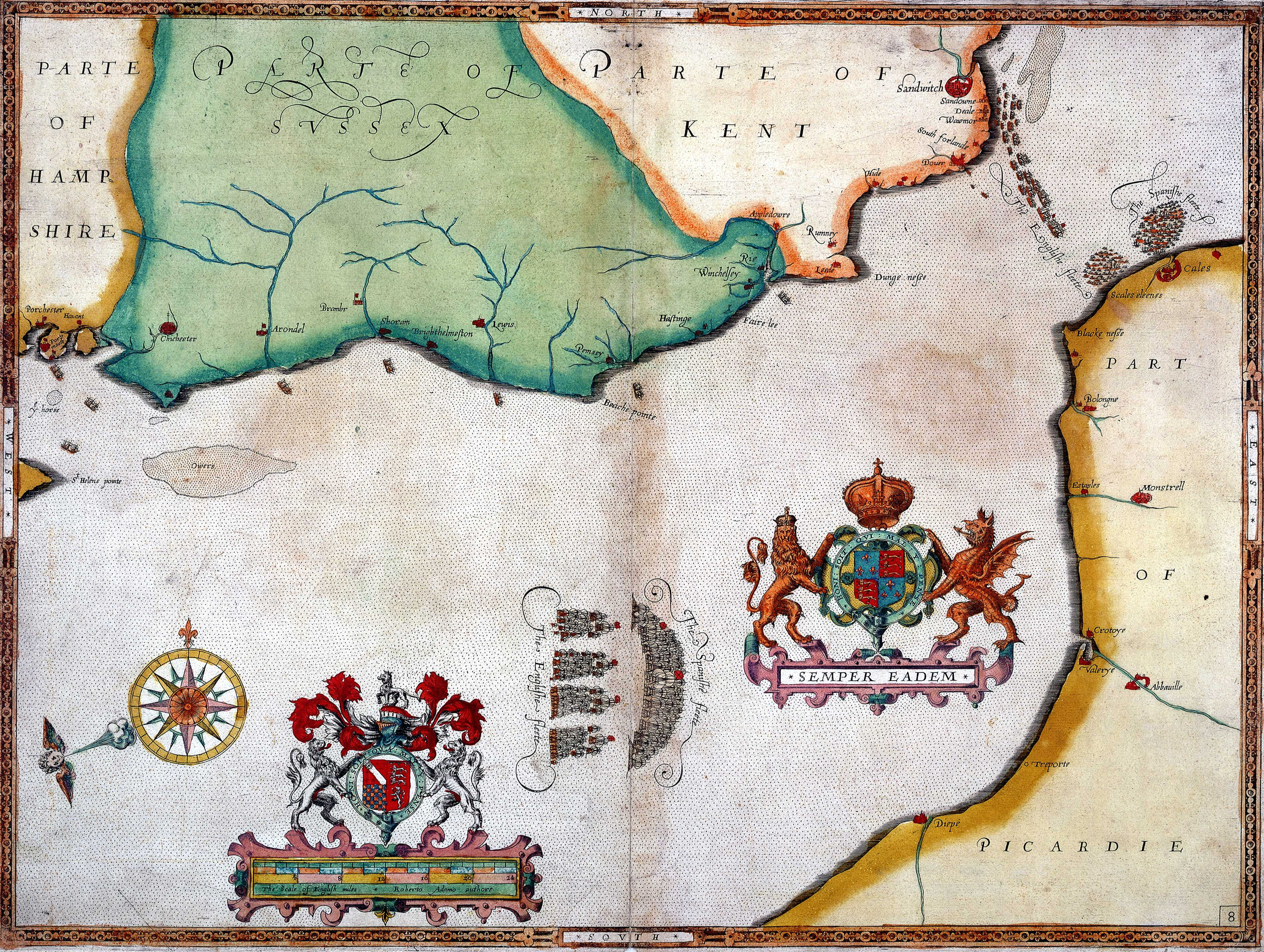
The pursuit to Calais, 4–6 August 1588 (N.S.)

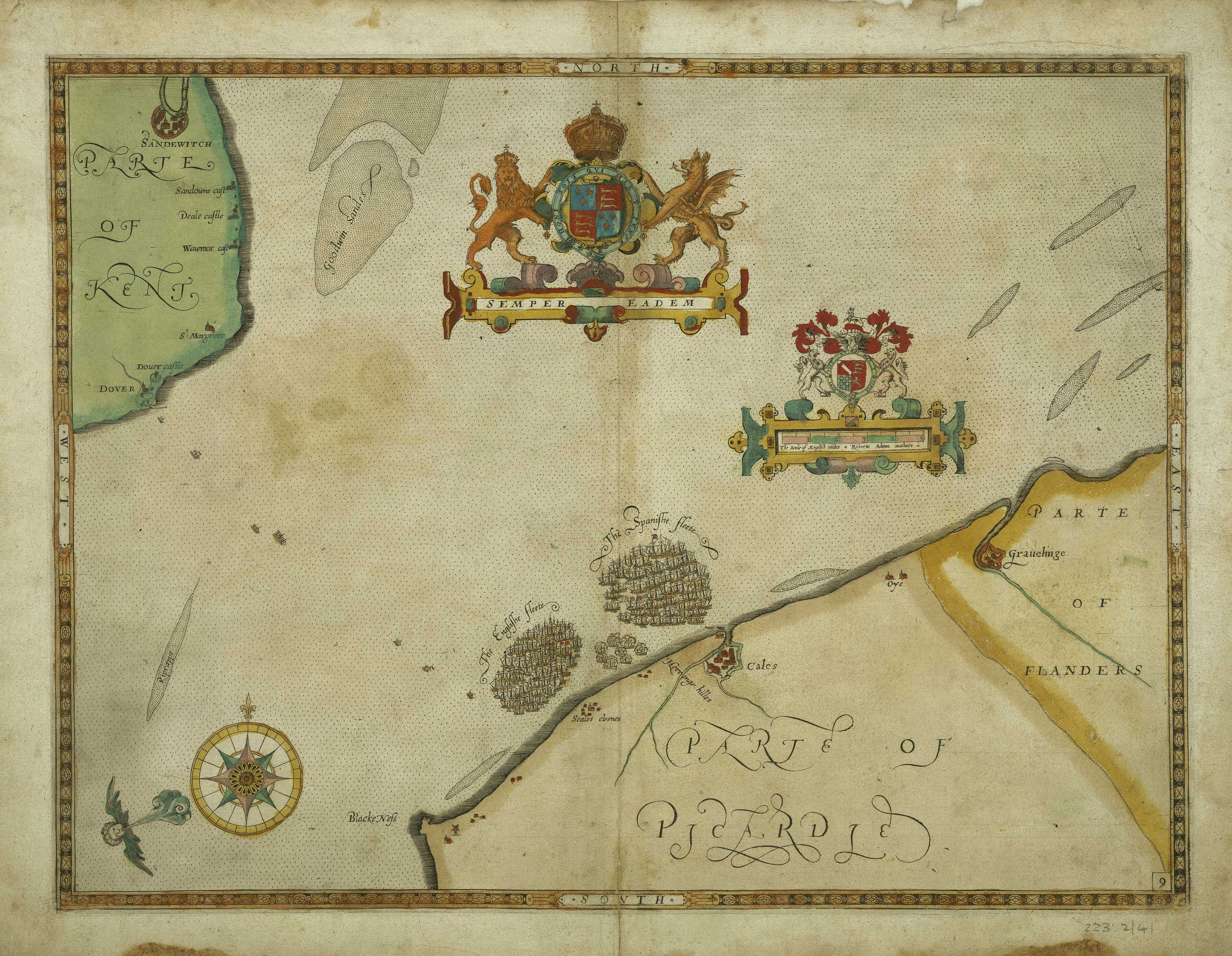
The fireship attack on the Spanish Armada, 7 August 1588 (N.S.)

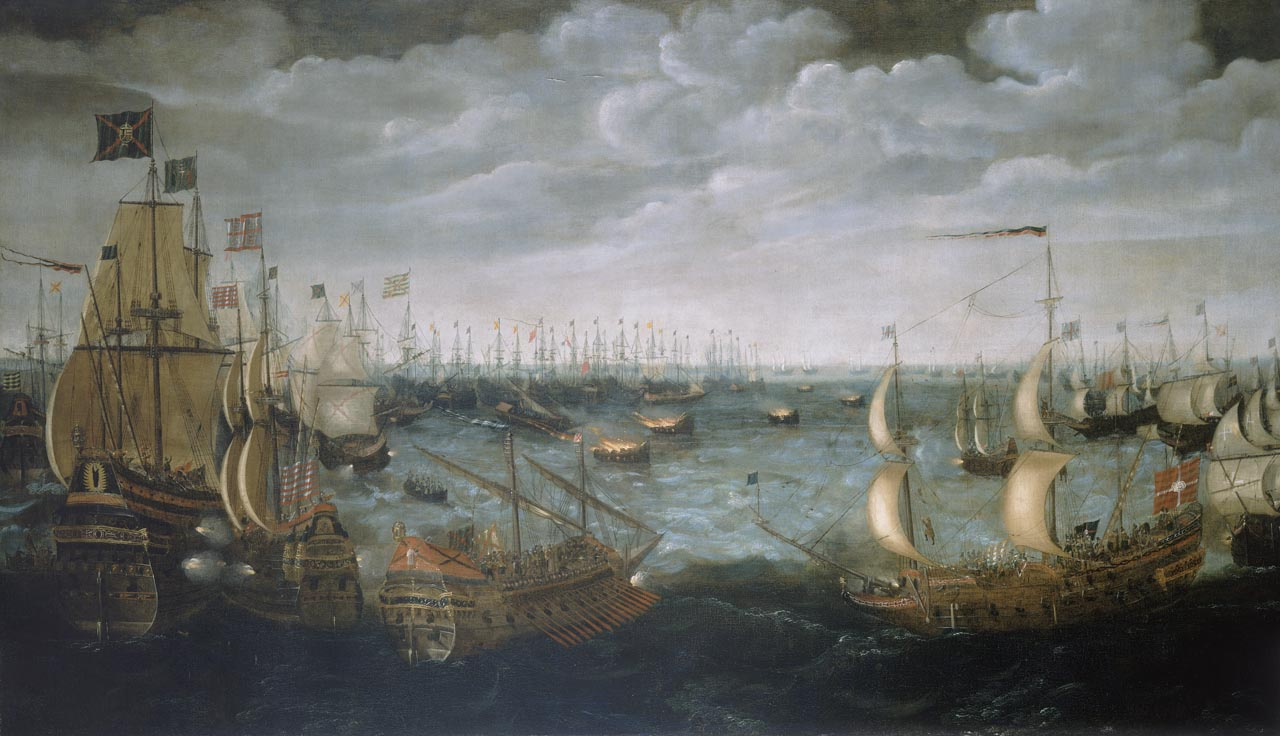
English fireships launched at the Spanish Armada off Calais (N.S.)

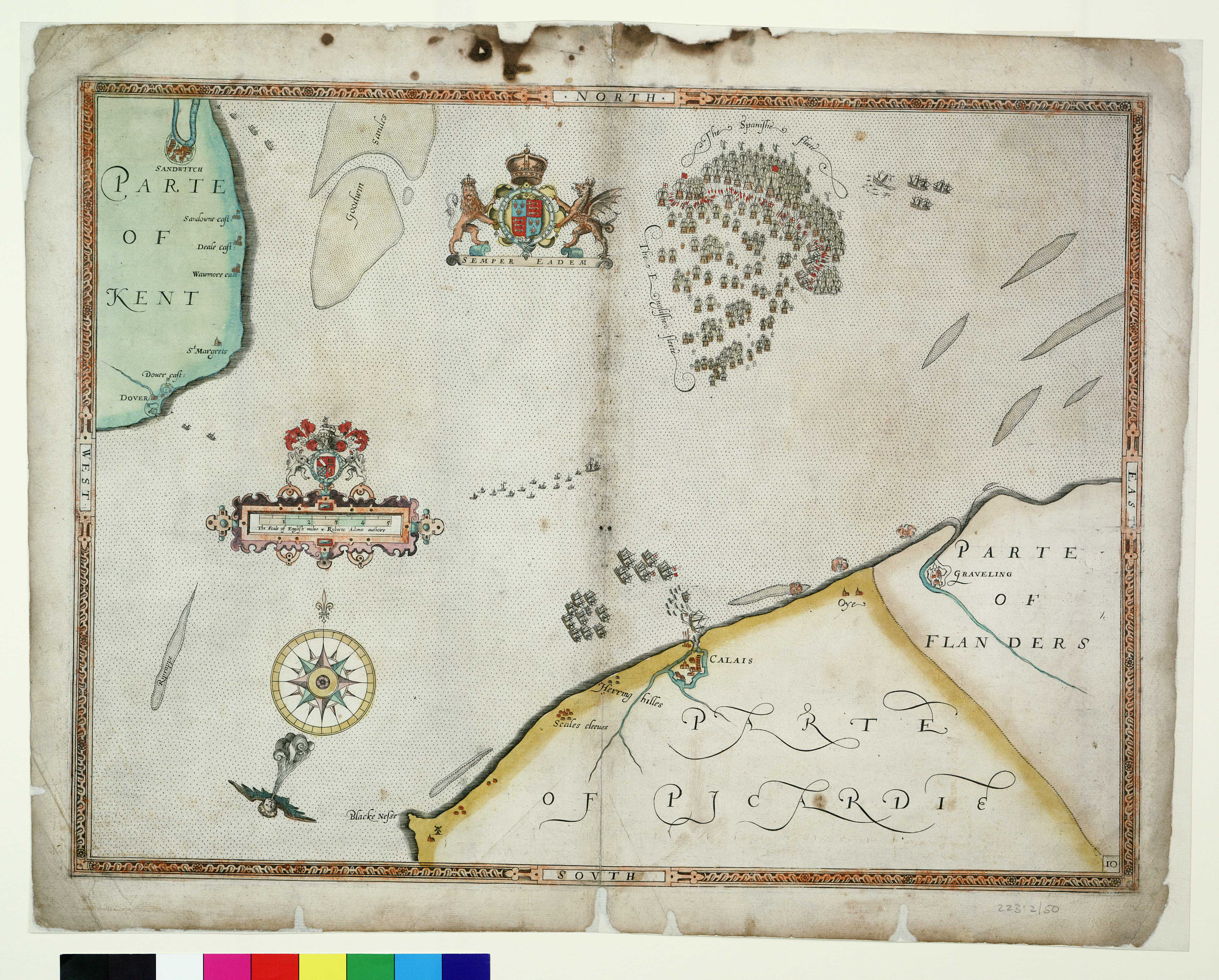
The battle off Gravelines, 8 August 1588 (N.S.)

=== Battle of Gravelines ===
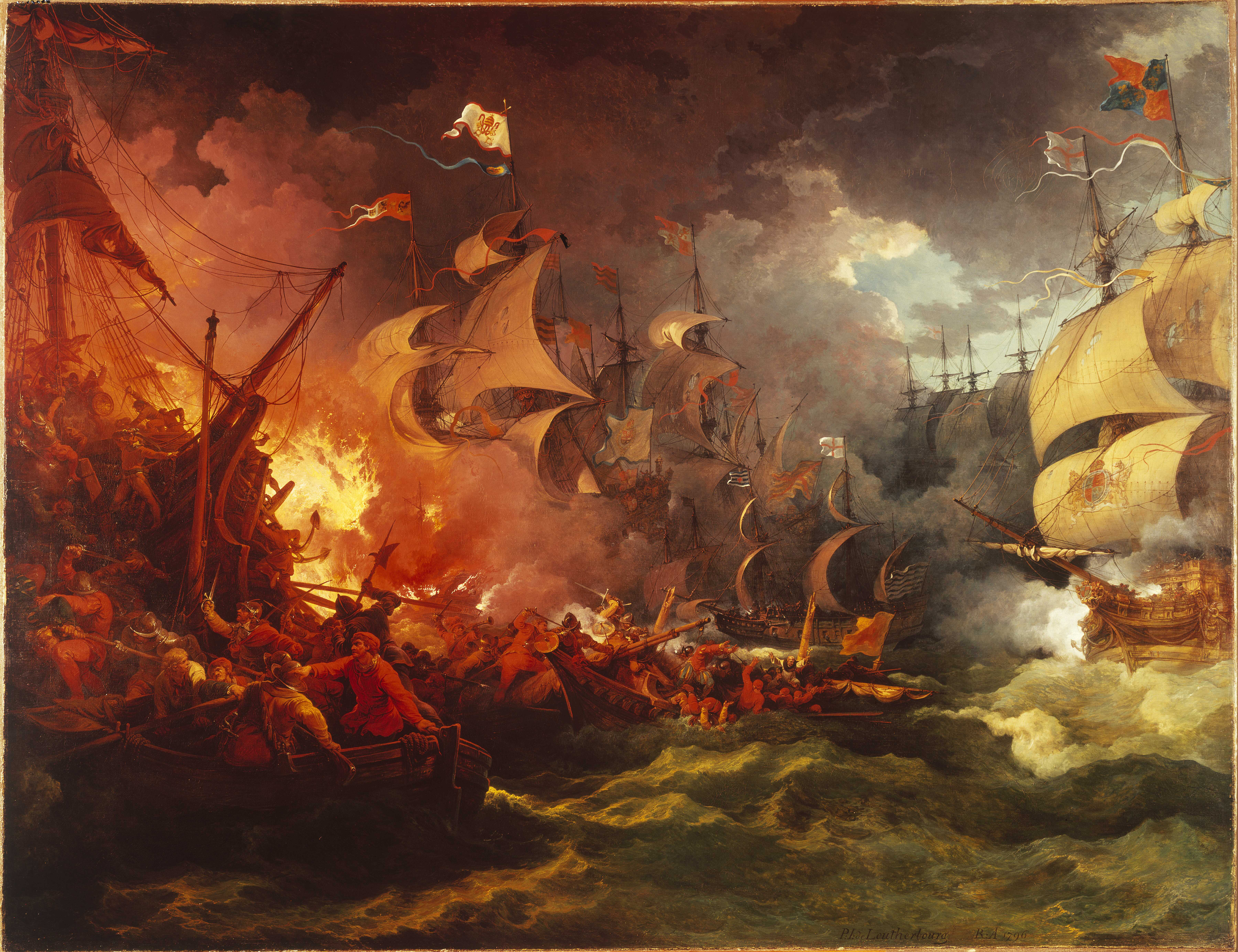
Defeat of the Spanish Armada, 8 August 1588, painted by Philip James de Loutherbourg (1796)

The small port of Gravelines was part of Flanders in the Spanish Netherlands close to the border with France, and was the closest Spanish territory to England.

Before dawn on 8 August, Medina Sidonia struggled to regather his fleet after the fireships scattered it, and was reluctant to sail further east than Gravelines, knowing the danger of running aground on the shoals off Flanders, from which his Dutch enemies had removed the sea marks. The English learned of the armada's weaknesses during the skirmishes in the English Channel, and concluded it was possible to close in to within 100 yards (90 m) to be able to penetrate the oak hulls of the Spanish warships. They had spent most of their gunpowder in the first engagements and had, after the Isle of Wight, been forced to conserve their heavy shot and powder for an anticipated attack near Gravelines. During all the engagements, the Spanish heavy guns could not easily be reloaded because of their close spacing and the quantities of supplies stowed between decks, as Drake had discovered on capturing the Nuestra Señora del Rosario in the Channel. Instead, the Spanish gunners fired once and then transferred to their main task, which was to board enemy ships, as had been the practice in naval warfare at the time. Evidence from Armada wrecks in Ireland shows that much of the fleet's ammunition was unused. Their determination to fight by boarding, rather than employing cannon fire at a distance, proved a disadvantage for the Spanish. The manoeuvre had been effective in the battles of Lepanto and Ponta Delgada earlier in the decade, but the English were aware of it and sought to avoid it by keeping their distance.

While Medina Sidonia was gathering the armada ships together into their traditional crescent formation the English fleet moved in, and at dawn the flagship with four other ships found themselves facing the entire English fleet. The English provoked Spanish fire while staying out of range. The English then closed, firing damaging broadsides into the enemy ships, all the while maintaining a windward position, so the heeling armada hulls were exposed to damage below the water line when they changed course later. Many of the Spanish gunners were killed or wounded by the English broadsides, and the task of manning the cannon often fell to foot soldiers who did not know how to operate them. The ships were close enough for sailors on the upper decks of the English and Spanish ships to exchange musket fire. A couple of hours into the battle, a few more armada warships closed in to form wings on either side of the five ships already under attack. After eight hours, the English ships began to run out of ammunition, and some gunners began loading objects such as chains into their cannons. Around 4 pm, the English fired their last shots and pulled back.

Five Spanish and Portuguese ships were lost: the 605 ton Maria Juan, a carrack which had been part of Don Diego Flores de Valdes' Castile Squadron which had attempted to surrender to Captain Robert Crosse of the Hope, sank off Blankenberge with the loss of 275 men – the Spanish only managing to rescue a single boatload of survivors. The galleass San Lorenzo, the flagship of Don Hugo de Moncada which had been holed below the waterline, was forced to run aground at Calais to avoid sinking. On sight of this, Admiral Howard ordered a flotilla of ship's boats to carry her by boarding. Moncada was killed during an exchange of small arms fire, a shot to his head from an arquebus. The ship was then taken after murderous fighting between the crew, galley slaves and the English. The French meanwhile could do little except to watch as the ship was plundered, but they opened fire to ward off the English who quickly left to join the rest of the fight. The next day, the severely crippled galleon San Mateo ran aground in between Sluis and Ostend; it was taken by a combination of Dutch ships and English troops led by Francis Vere. The captain, Don Diego Pimmental, surrendered along with the survivors of his crew. Later that day, the equally crippled San Felipe, commanded by Maestre de Campo Don Fransico de Toledo, drifted away as she was sinking and ran aground on the island of Walcheren. The English troops sortied from Flushing to the wreck, attacked the stricken vessel, and took the crew prisoners. A Dutch force of flyboats led by Justinus van Nassau then took possession of the ship. A pinnace was also run aground by her crew to prevent her from sinking.

Many other Spanish ships were severely damaged, especially the Portuguese and some Spanish Atlantic-class galleons, including some Neapolitan galleys, which bore the brunt of the fighting during the early hours of the battle: the Spanish Nuestra Señora del Rosario, San Salvador, and La María Juan; the Neapolitan San Lorenzo; and the Portuguese São Mateus and São Filipe. The Spanish plan to join with Parma's army had been frustrated.

=== Elizabeth's Tilbury speech ===
Because of the potential invasion from the Netherlands, Robert Dudley, Earl of Leicester assembled a force of 4,500 militia at West Tilbury, Essex, to defend the Thames Estuary against any incursion up-river towards London. The result of the English fireship attack and the sea battle of Gravelines had not yet reached England, so Elizabeth went to Tilbury on 18 August to review her forces, arriving on horseback in ceremonial armour to imply to the militia that she was prepared to lead them in the ensuing battle. (Note: According to Mattingly "an objective observer would have seen no more than a battered, rather scraggy spinster in her middle fifties perched on a fat white horse, her teeth black, her red wig slightly askew, dangling a toy sword and wearing an absurd little piece of parade armor like something out of a theatrical property box") She gave them her royal address, which survives in at least six slightly different versions. One version is as follows:

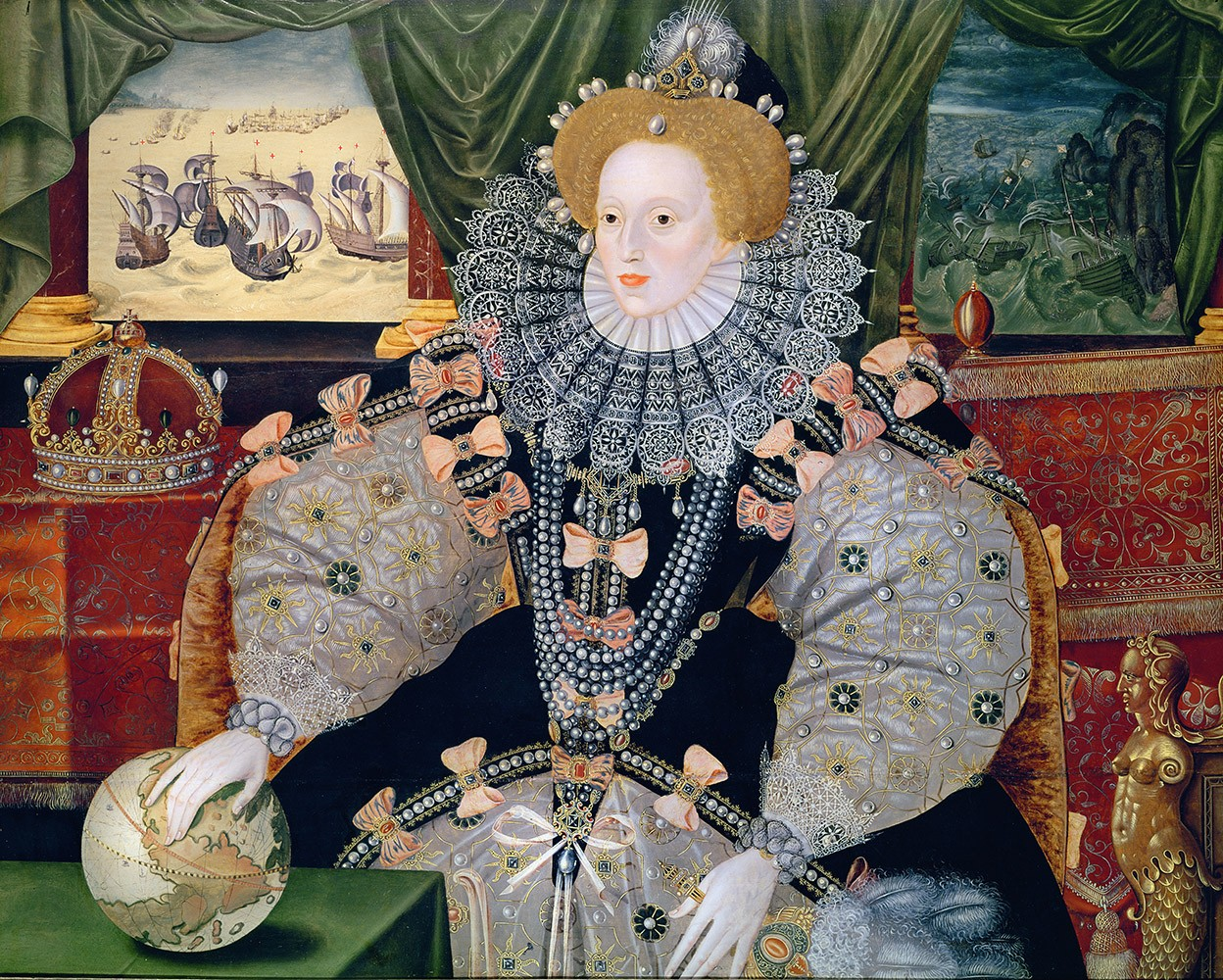
Queen Elizabeth I, the Armada Portrait at Woburn Abbey, Bedfordshire

My loving people, we have been persuaded by some that are careful of our safety, to take heed how we commit ourselves to armed multitudes for fear of treachery; but, I do assure you, I do not desire to live to distrust my faithful and loving people. Let tyrants fear, I have always so behaved myself, that under God I have placed my chiefest strength and safeguard in the loyal hearts and goodwill of my subjects; and, therefore, I am come amongst you as you see at this time, not for my recreation and disport, but being resolved, in the midst and heat of battle, to live or die amongst you all – to lay down for my God, and for my kingdoms, and for my people, my honour and my blood even in the dust. I know I have the body of a weak and feeble woman; but I have the heart and stomach of a king – and of a King of England too, and think foul scorn that Parma or Spain, or any prince of Europe, should dare to invade the borders of my realm; to which, rather than any dishonour should grow by me, I myself will take up arms – I myself will be your general, judge, and rewarder of every one of your virtues in the field. I know already, for your forwardness, you have deserved rewards and crowns, and, we do assure you, on the word of a prince, they shall be duly paid you. In the mean time, my lieutenant general shall be in my stead, than whom never prince commanded a more noble or worthy subject; not doubting but by your obedience to my general, by your concord in the camp, and your valour in the field, we shall shortly have a famous victory over those enemies of my God, of my kingdom, and of my people.

— Elizabeth I

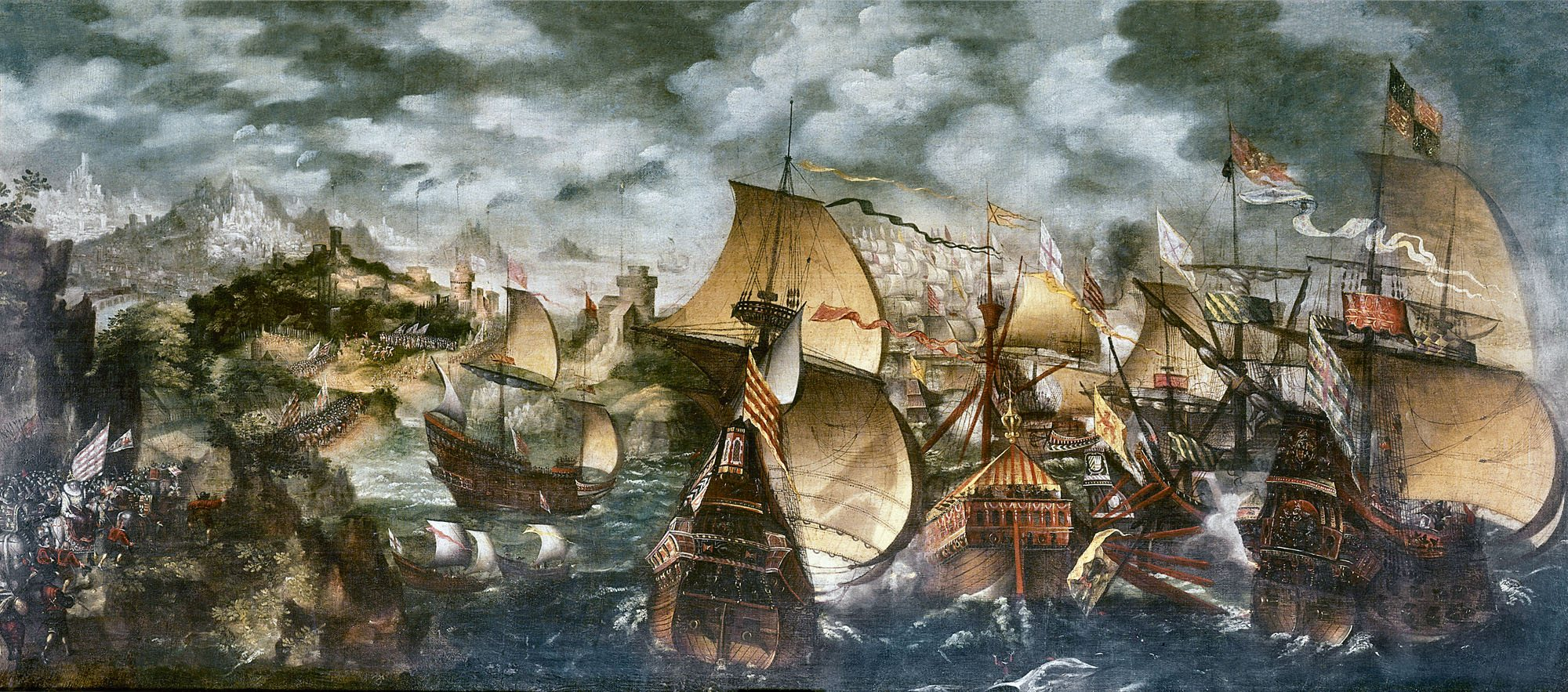
Elizabeth I and the Spanish Armada; the Worshipful Society of Apothecaries painting, previously attributed to Nicholas Hilliard. A stylised depiction of key elements of the armada story: the alarm beacons, Queen Elizabeth at Tilbury, and the sea battle at Gravelines.

=== Armada in Scotland and Ireland ===
On the day after the battle at Gravelines, the disorganised and unmanoeuvrable Spanish fleet was at risk of running onto the sands of Zeeland because of the prevailing wind. The wind then changed to the south, enabling the fleet to sail north. The English ships under Howard pursued to prevent any landing on English soil, although by this time his ships were almost out of shot. On 12 August, Howard called a halt to the pursuit at about the latitude of the Firth of Forth off Scotland. The only option left to the Spanish ships was to return to Spain by sailing round the north of Scotland and home via the Atlantic or the Irish Sea. As the Spanish fleet rounded Scotland on 20 August, it consisted of 110 vessels and most made it around. The San Juan de Sicilia, heavily damaged during the Gravelines engagement, had struggled North and limped into Tobermory bay on the Isle of Mull on 23 September, but was later destroyed by an English agent sent by Francis Walsingham with most of the crew on board. El Gran Grifón was wrecked on Fair Isle, depositing around 260 soldiers and crew there, who stayed for a month before they could move on to Shetland, then to Anstruther and subsequently Edinburgh. By tradition, the Spaniards are said to have influenced Fair Isle knitting.

The Spanish ships were beginning to show wear from the long voyage, and some were kept together by strengthening their damaged hulls with cables. Supplies of food and water ran short. The intention would have been to keep to the west of the coasts of Scotland and Ireland, seeking the relative safety of the open sea. There being no way of accurately measuring longitude, the Spanish were not aware that the Gulf Stream was carrying them north and east as they tried to move west, and they eventually turned south much closer to the coast than they thought. Off Scotland and Ireland, the fleet ran into a series of powerful westerly winds which drove many of the damaged ships further towards the lee shore. Because so many anchors had been abandoned during the escape from the English fireships off Calais, many of the ships were incapable of securing shelter as the fleet reached the coast of Ireland and were driven onto the rocks; local inhabitants looted the ships. The late sixteenth century and especially 1588 was marked by unusually strong North Atlantic storms, perhaps associated with a high accumulation of polar ice off the coast of Greenland, a feature of the "Little Ice Age". More ships and sailors were lost to cold and stormy weather than in direct combat.

Most of the 28 ships lost in the storms were along the jagged steep rocks of the western coast of Ireland. About 5,000 men died by drowning, starvation and slaughter by local inhabitants after their ships were driven ashore on the west coasts of Scotland and Ireland. The English Lord Deputy William FitzWilliam ordered the English soldiers in Ireland to kill any Spanish prisoners, which was done on several occasions instead of asking for ransom as was common during that period. Reports of the passage of the remnants of the Spanish Armada around Ireland abound with onerous accounts of hardships and survival. One of the costliest wrecks was that of the galleass La Girona, which was driven on to Lacada Point in County Antrim on the night of 26 October. Of the estimated 1,300 people on board, there were nine survivors. 260 bodies washed ashore, including Alonso Martínez de Leiva, knight and member of the Council of Thirteen (trece) of the Order of Santiago. Captain Francisco de Cuéllar was wrecked on the coast of Ireland and gave a remarkable account of his experiences in the fleet, on the run in Ireland, defeat of an English army besieging Rosclogher castle, flight through Scotland, surviving a second shipwreck and ultimate return to Spain.

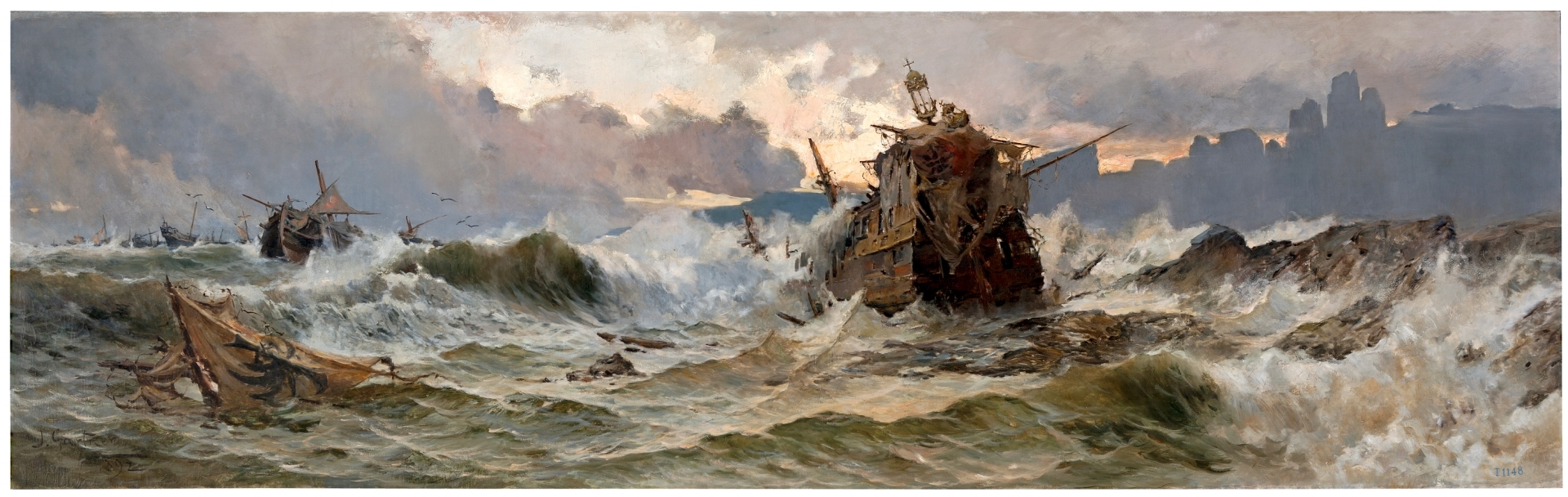
Destruction of the Invincible Armada by Spanish painter Jose Gartner (1892)

=== Return to Spain ===
Continental Europe had been anxiously awaiting news of the armada all summer. The Spanish postmaster and Spanish agents in Rome promoted reports of Spanish victory in hopes of convincing Pope Sixtus V to release his promise of one million ducats upon landing of troops. In France, the Spanish and English ambassadors promoted contradictory narratives in the press, and a Spanish victory was incorrectly celebrated in Paris, Prague, and Venice. It was not until late August that reliable reports of the Spanish defeat arrived in major cities and were widely believed.

The first rumours of a setback for the armada began to reach Spain when news of the English fireships breaking the Spanish formation at Calais was received, but this was disbelieved. The King noted "I hope God has not permitted so much evil". Nothing was heard for nearly two weeks and it was not until 21 September that the first of the ships of the armada began to arrive into Spain – the first of eight entered into Coruña which included Medina Sidonia's San Martin. Over the next few days Diego Flores took 22 more into Laredo harbour and Miguel de Oquendo brought five more into the port of Guipuzcoa.

After Medina Sidonia entered Coruña, and following the death of Admiral Miguel de Oquendo, Captain Diego de Medrano was appointed interim Admiral to command the remaining armada back to Spain. By mid-October it was becoming more apparent for the Spanish that few if any more of the remaining missing ships of the armada would return. Even in November three months after the battles through the Channel, a few Spanish ships were still attempting the journey home. One of the last, the Spanish hospital ship San Pedro El Mayor, carrying some 200 sick and wounded survivors, came into Hope Cove in Devon on 7 November, the commander trying to find a suitable place to ground her. The crew were taken prisoner and the sick were treated in Bodmin and Plympton.

== Aftermath ==
Route taken by the Spanish Armada

After the Duke of Parma was certain that the armada had sailed away from the coast of Flanders and his participation in the invasion project was no longer feasible, he ordered his soldiers to disembark so as to avoid an epidemic of disease. He then assembled his council of war to discuss what endeavours his forces could be used for before the onset of winter. In late September, he divided them into three groups; one was sent to the Rhine, one was to remain in the coastal region and one was led by Parma himself against Bergen-op-Zoom. There, in November, he was repelled with heavy losses by the Anglo-Dutch garrison, which, in combination with poor weather, forced him to abandon the siege.An attempt to take the Dutch-held island of Tholen was also repelled. From the armada campaign to Bergen, Parma's forces had lost some 10,000 men killed or dead from disease.

=== England and the Netherlands ===
Even though the Spanish Armada had failed to invade England it had demonstrated its feasibility and shown that the British Isles overall were vulnerable to attack.

The day after her Tilbury speech, Elizabeth ordered the army disbanded, the camp at Tilbury dissolved five days later, then discharged the navy, sending them home without pay. All the while, the costs of this defensive effort were mounting – the total was nearly £400,000 – and measures were put in motion to mitigate it. Typhus, scurvy and dysentery swept through the crews and many died of disease and starvation after landing at Margate. For instance, of the Bonaventure's crew of 500, more than 200 had died and the Elizabeth Jonas had just one living from the crew that it had sailed with. Howard wrote to Lord Burghley, Elizabeth's Lord High Treasurer, "it would grieve any man's heart to see them that have served so valiantly die so miserably". Hawkins also weighed in and accused Burghley "that by death, by discharging of sick men, and such like, that there may be spared something in the general pay". The men had to rely on the charity of their officers, and Howard set an example by doing what he could out of his own purse to help the sailors. Nevertheless, upwards of 3,000 perished. As a result, the Chatham Chest was set up, its purpose to help pay pensions to disabled seamen.

It took some time for the scale of the victory to be realised as news began to filter through by the end of August and beginning of September. As a result, a number of thanksgiving services were held at cathedrals and churches throughout England. At St Paul's Cathedral in London a series of thanksgiving services took place, the first on 30 August where a sermon was preached, followed by another on 18 September. As news of the full scale of the disaster came through, and also news of England's victory against Parma at Bergen-op-Zoom, a bigger national service of thanksgiving took place on 29 November. A second and final thanksgiving took place five days later which saw a royal procession of the Queen in a chariot through the streets of London. Twelve Spanish standards and other trophies which had been captured from the ships of the armada decorated the choir of St Paul during the huge service.

The captured Spanish galleons Nuestra Señora del Rosario and the San Salvador were studied by the English. The San Salvador became known as the "Great Spaniard" but was lost in a wreck in November 1588 off Studland. Nuestra Señora del Rosario was brought to Dartmouth. The 397 crew were taken to Torre Abbey near Torquay where they were held prisoner in a barn (today called the 'Spanish Barn') and spared execution. The Rosario was later sent to Chatham where she was dry docked and eventually sunk to support a wharf. Pedro de Valdés was held prisoner in the Tower of London for five years, until his ransom was paid by his family for his release back to Spain. He was not blamed for the loss of his ship and was appointed colonial governor of Cuba from 1602 to 1608.

The Dutch also celebrated the victory and their artists were quick to take on commemorative medals and paintings which were soon circulated within the year. The wrecked Spanish galleons San Mateo and San Felipe which had run aground were both found to be riddled with holes by cannonballs that had struck below the waterline. Both ships were too damaged to be salvaged and were therefore broken up; the cannons were used by the Dutch in nearby fortresses. The main-topmast rigging banner from the San Matteo, part of which depicts Christ on the cross, was taken, hung and displayed in the choir of St Peters Church in Leiden. It now resides in the Museum De Lakenhal.

=== Spain ===
The news of the disaster brought shock and despair and the nation went into mourning. Its defeat was even more devastating because hopes of its success had been raised by false rumours. These included Drake and Howard being taken prisoner, the Isle of Wight and Plymouth taken and Parma's army even approaching London. The King took the news hard and shut himself away for days. The daily business of government was also brought to an abrupt halt. The King is claimed to have said: "I sent the armada against men, not God's winds and waves". News of the loss of La Girona bore more despair for Philip: not only De Leiva but also his followers from almost every noble house in Spain had drowned with it.

The number of ships lost has been debated. A detailed study by Spanish naval historian Fernandez Duro in the mid-1880s claimed that 63 in total were lost. Historian José Luis Casado Soto examined the fate of each ship creating individual dossiers and claimed that 35 ships were lost. In addition it was noted that of the 122 armada ships that entered the English Channel, 87 returned from their voyage through the Channel and around the British isles. These figures do not include eight that were unaccounted for.Other historians have done further research; Neil Hanson, Robert Hutchinson, Colin Martin and Geoffrey Parker all researched the armada ships that had returned, coming to the same conclusion of between 44 and 51 ships being lost overall, with more detailed breakdowns in the number of ships that set sail along with their fate. That figure represents a third of the fleet having been sunk, captured, wrecked, or scuttled. American historian Garrett Mattingly noted that only 66 ships returned to Spain, with another returning later in the year. The losses did not include the smaller vulnerable ships like the pataches and zarbas, of which around seventeen were lost. Even though most of the ships had returned, many of them were severely damaged from either the storms or English gunfire. One hulk, the Doncella, sank after they had cast anchor in Santander, and the Santa Anna was accidentally burned within a few days of entering San Sebastian. In addition the severely damaged galleons San Marcos and San Francisco were broken up, the guns and the timber being sold off. As many as half of the fleet were unfit for further service and as a result a number were scuttled, broken up or left to rot.

Furthermore, Spanish sources state that no more than 11,000 perished. Philip's administrators, bureaucrats and secretaries documented, dated and filed everything that went on in all corners of the Spanish empire, and all those records are still kept in the National Archives of Spain and the Escorial. The number of men lost was extracted from the paymaster distribution lists. A detailed analysis of the human cost of the campaign reveals that 25,696 men left Coruña and 13,399 returned. The lowest estimate is 9,000 dead.

Even after arrival the men were near death from disease, as the conditions were very cramped, and most of the ships had run out of food and water. More armada survivors later died in Spain or on hospital ships in Spanish harbours from diseases contracted during the voyage. A large number of prominent Spanish commanders also died, many after having arrived in port. Vice Admiral of the fleet and commander of the Guipuzcoa Squadron, Miguel de Oquendo, suffering from battle wounds and a fever, died at Coruña two days after arriving. Another was the Biscayan squadron commander Juan Martínez de Recalde, who also succumbed the same way. The Duke of Medina Sidonia also fell ill on his return and nearly succumbed; he was not blamed by Philip, who allowed him to return home to convalesce. Hutchinson claimed that the number of survivors was just over 50%, but these numbers do not include the Portuguese, the Neapolitans and the galley slaves; while Hanson claimed that fewer than 10,000 men (38%) survived the expedition. (Note: "In the end as many as two-thirds of the armada's original complement of 30,000 died and for every one killed in battle or perishing of their wounds another six or eight died due to [non-combat losses]".)

=== English Counter-Armada ===
The following year the English with Dutch conscripts launched the Counter-Armada under Sir Francis Drake and Sir John Norris with three tasks:

- Destroy the battered Spanish Atlantic fleet, which was being repaired in ports of northern Spain
- Make a landing at Lisbon, Portugal, and raise a revolt there against King Philip II (Philip I of Portugal) installing the pretender Dom António, Prior of Crato to the Portuguese throne
- Take the Azores if possible so as to establish a permanent base.

The expedition ended in a heavy defeat and none of the objectives were achieved. Dozens of ships were lost, thousands of English soldiers and sailors died, and heavy economic losses were incurred, in a similar disaster to the Spanish Armada. The attempt to restore the Portuguese Crown from Spain was unsuccessful, and the opportunity to strike a decisive blow against the weakened Spanish Navy was lost. The expedition depleted the financial resources of England's treasury, which had been carefully restored during the long reign of Elizabeth I. Through this lost opportunity, Philip II's naval power marked a revival through the next decade. The following year he sent 37 ships with 6,420 men to Brittany where they established a base of operations on the Blavet river. The English and Dutch ultimately failed to disrupt the various fleets of the Indies despite the great number of military personnel mobilised every year.

=== Course of the war ===
During the course of the war, the Spanish struggled to gain control of the English Channel and to halt English transatlantic privateering. One of the first major English offensives after the failure of the Spanish Armada was the English Armada of 1589, a large expedition sent against Spain which ended in failure at Corunna and Lisbon, frustrating English hopes of destroying Spanish naval power. From their base in Brittany, Spanish corsairs made several incursions on the English coast and plundered English and Dutch shipping. The Spanish also launched a number of attacks on the English coast, including the Raid on Mount's Bay in Cornwall in August 1595, during which Penzance, Newlyn, Mousehole and Paul were raided and burned, followed by a smaller but unsuccessful attack on Cawsand the following year.

English offensive operations also met with mixed results. The Drake and Hawkins expedition of 1595–1596 failed to secure lasting gains in the Caribbean: the English were repulsed at the Battle of San Juan in November 1595 and again during Drake's Assault on Panama in January 1596. In June 1596, England and the United Dutch Provinces sent an expedition to Spain which captured and sacked Cádiz, holding the city for roughly two weeks and inflicting substantial economic damage, but failing to intercept the Spanish treasure fleet. Meanwhile, the English Islands Voyage of 1597 failed to destroy the Spanish fleet or intercept the treasure convoy in the Azores. After Cádiz, Spain sent three more armadas. The armada of 1596 was scattered by storms before it could achieve its objectives; the armada of 1597 was likewise disrupted, with several vessels captured or destroyed by the English; and the last armada, sent to Ireland in October 1601, ended in surrender after the Siege of Kinsale in January 1602. Large-scale operations gradually diminished thereafter, and the conflict formally ended with the Treaty of London in 1604.

== Technological revolution ==
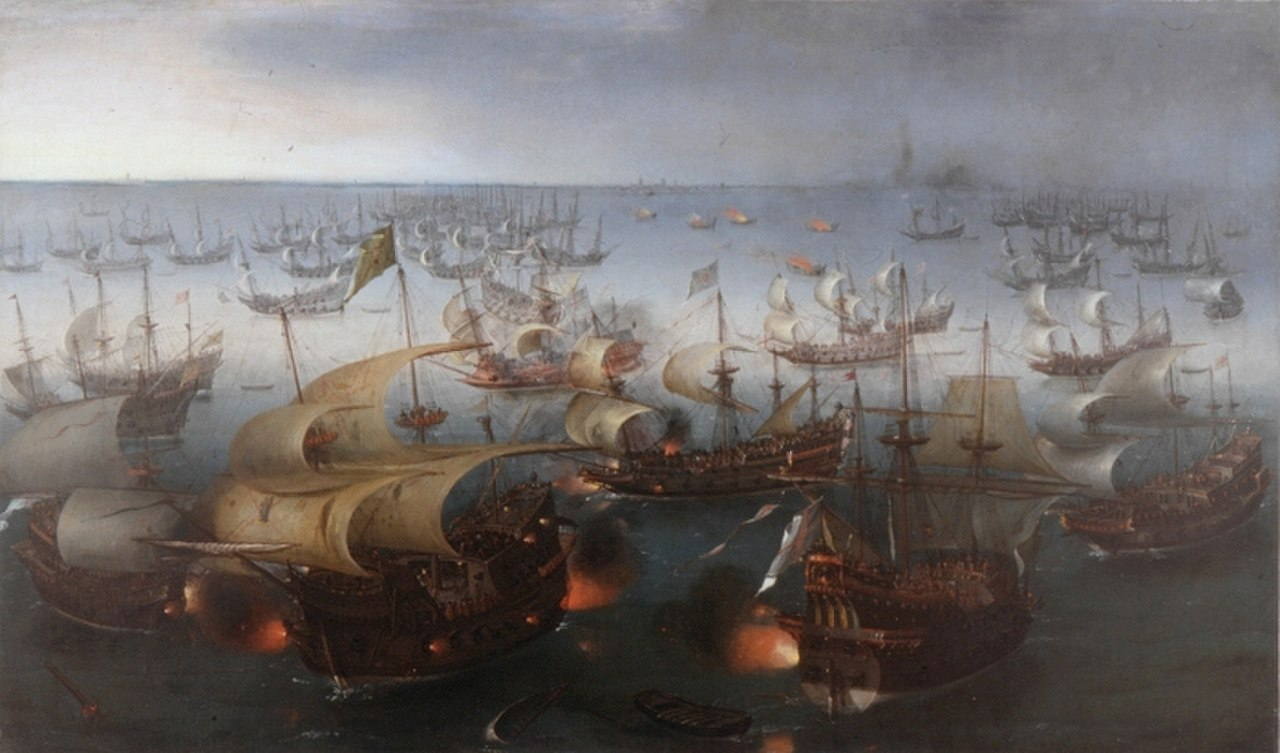
Day seven of the battle with the armada, 7 August 1588, by Hendrick Cornelisz Vroom 1601

The Spanish had 117 ships to go up against more than 200 English ships. The opposing forces were experienced in completely different fighting styles. The Spanish style can be studied from the Battle of Lepanto. Their tactics were to fire one cannon volley, ram and grapple the enemy ship, board, then engage in hand-to-hand combat. In contrast, the English style was taking advantage of the wind (the "weather gage") and line-to-line cannon fire from windward, which exposed the opponent ship's hull and rudder as targets. Also instilled was the use of naval cannon to damage enemy ships without the need to board. Until then, the cannon had played a supporting role to the main tactic of ramming and boarding enemy ships. The failure of the Spanish Armada vindicated the English strategy and caused a revolution in naval tactics. The English also had the advantage of fighting close to home, whence they could be easily and frequently resupplied so as not to be weighed down, unlike the armada ships which were loaded with all the materiel needed for their invasion force to wage a ground-based war. Nevertheless, when the fleets actually came to blows at the Battle of Gravelines, the armada was outnumbered 10:1, and during the 8-hour fight, the English managed to sink one carrack and forced two galleons, a pinnace and an armed merchant to run aground. Despite those odds, not once did the armada turn away from a fight; each time it challenged the English fleet, the latter raised its sails to keep its distance. After the final engagement with the English fleet, the Spanish fleet sailed away, retaining its ability to effectively wage war.

Most military historians hold that the battle of Gravelines reflected a lasting shift in the balance of naval power in favour of the English, in part because of the gap in naval technology and cannon armament which continued into the next century. In the words of historian Geoffrey Parker, by 1588, "the capital ships of the Elizabethan navy constituted the most powerful battlefleet afloat anywhere in the world". The English navy yards were leaders in technical innovation, and the captains devised new battle formations and tactics. The sleeker and more manoeuvrable full-rigged ship, with ample cannon, was one of the greatest advances of the century and permanently transformed naval warfare.

English shipwrights introduced novel designs, first demonstrated in the Foresight in 1570 and the Dreadnought in 1573, that allowed the ships to sail faster, manoeuvre better, and carry more and heavier guns. Whereas before warships had tried to grapple with each other so soldiers could board the enemy ship, they were able to stand off and fire broadside cannonades that could sink the vessel. English ships and seamanship had foiled the invasion. The English also benefited from Spain's unworkable strategy that required coordination between the invasion fleet and the Spanish army on shore. (Note: Although the English attempted the same tactic in Portugal the following year, the army under Norris' command marching on Lisbon expecting Drake to simultaneously attack the city with his ships.Gorrochategui Santos 2018, p. 123) The outdated design of the Spanish cannon meant that they were much slower in reloading in a close-range battle, allowing the English to take control. Spain still had numerically larger fleets, but England was catching up.

== Legacy ==
In England, the battle was followed by the distribution of flyers, pamphlets, the striking of victory medals, and numerous joyous celebrations. The victory prompted a huge David vs Goliath propaganda offensive, and its exploitation boosted national pride which lasted for years. Elizabeth's legend persisted and grew long after her death. It also may have given heart to the Protestant cause across Europe and the belief that God was behind the Protestants. (Note: The 1588 campaign was a major English propaganda victory, but in strategic terms it was essentially indecisive) This was shown by the striking of commemorative medals that bore variations on the inscription, "1588. Flavit Jehovah et Dissipati Sunt" – with "Jehovah" in Hebrew letters ('God blew, and they are scattered'), or 'He blew with His winds, and they were scattered'. There were also more lighthearted medals struck, such as the one with the play on the words of Julius Caesar: Venit, Vidit, Fugit ('he came, he saw, he fled'). The wind that scattered the armada has been called the Protestant Wind, a phrase also used for later invasions of England that failed.

The memory of the victory over the armada was evoked several times British history. Notably during the Dutch 1688 invasion of England, the Napoleonic Wars and the Second World War, when Britain again faced a substantial danger of foreign invasion. During the Battle of Britain RAF fighter pilots attracted world attention as the "new Elizabethans". The Armada Memorial in Plymouth was constructed in 1888 to celebrate the tercentenary of the defeat of the Spanish Armada.

One of the greatest finds of the Spanish Armada was the remains of the wreck of La Girona, found by a team of Belgian divers off the coast of Portballintrae in 1968. It was the greatest treasure salvaged up until that time. Gold and silver coins, jewellery, armaments and other objects are on permanent display at the Ulster Museum (part of the National Museums of Northern Ireland) in Stranmillis in Belfast.

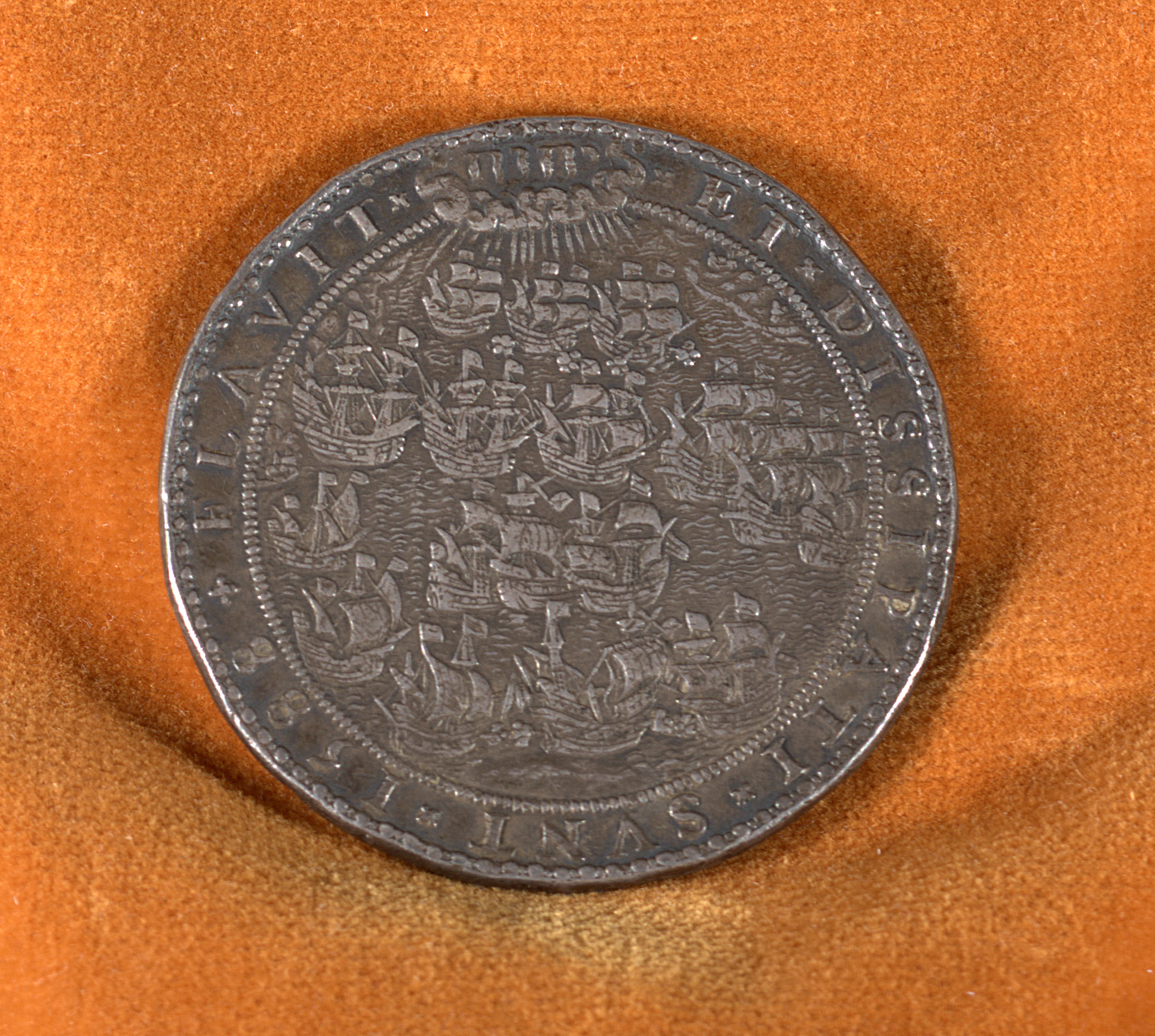
Armada Medal, bearing the inscription Flavit Jehovah et Dissipati Sunt

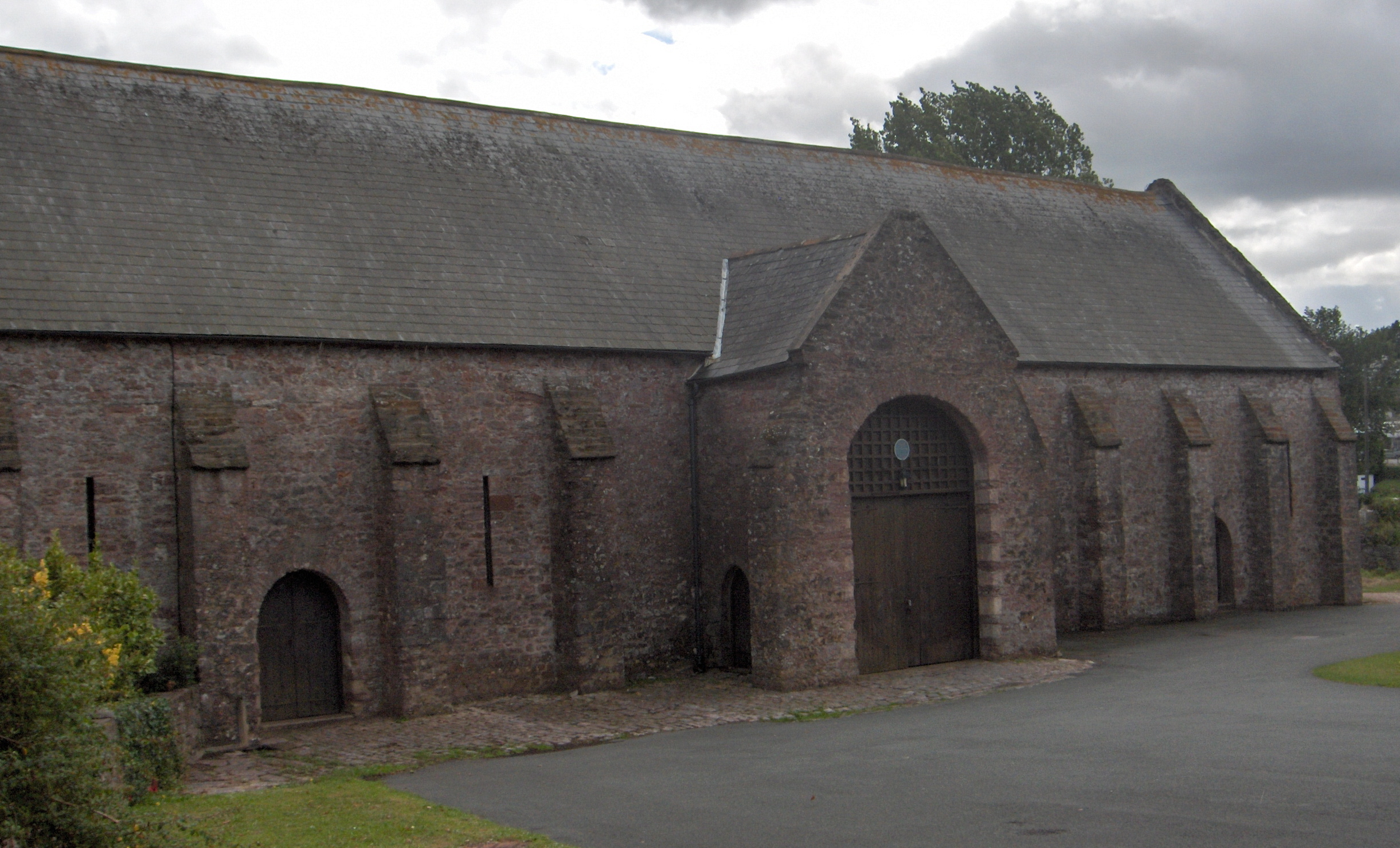
The Spanish Barn at Torre Abbey – it holds a Blue Plaque noting that it held 397 Spanish prisoners of war for fourteen days during the armada campaign

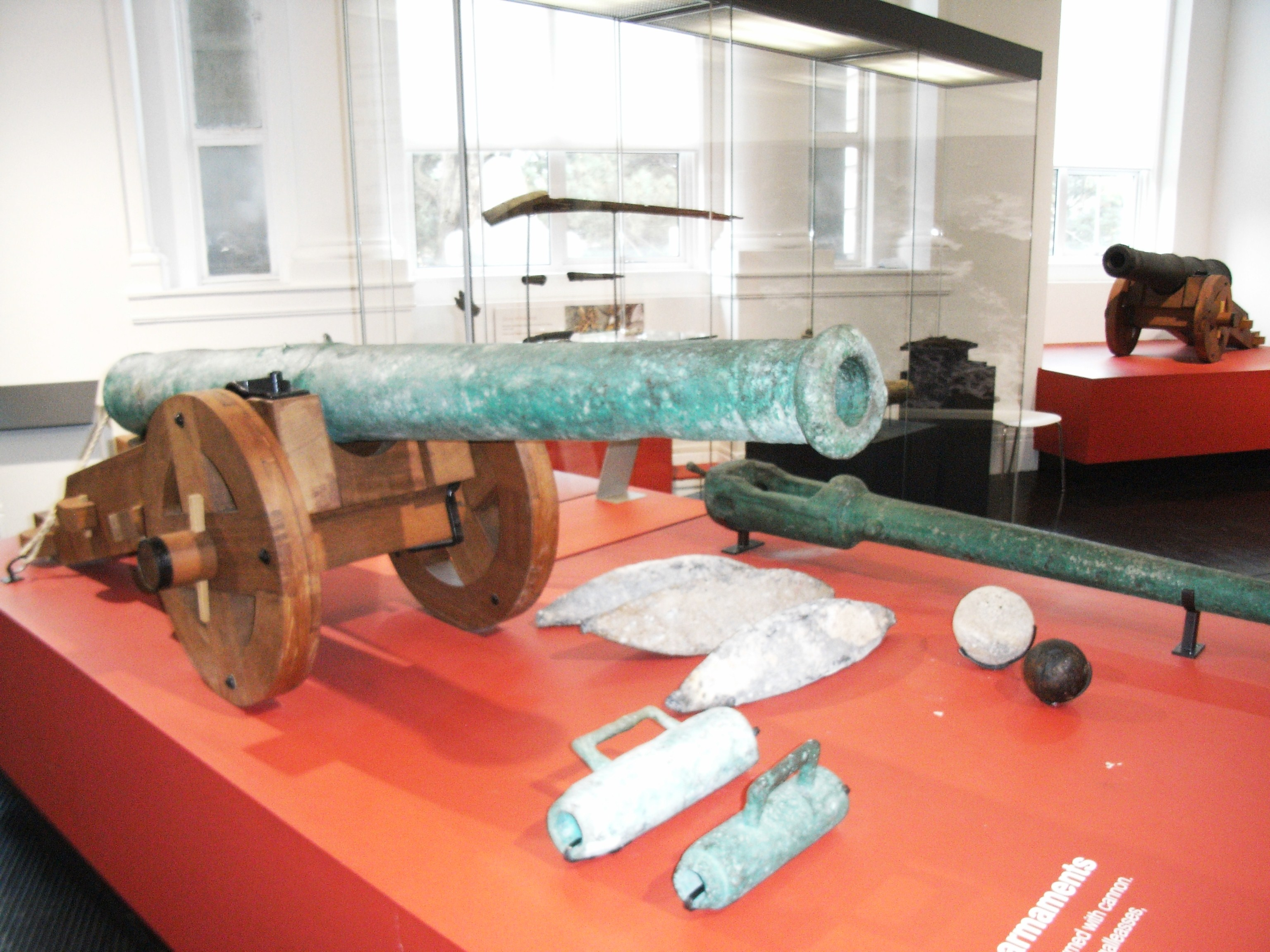
Bronze saker on carriage and other armament from the Spanish Armada ship, La Girona, Ulster Museum, Belfast

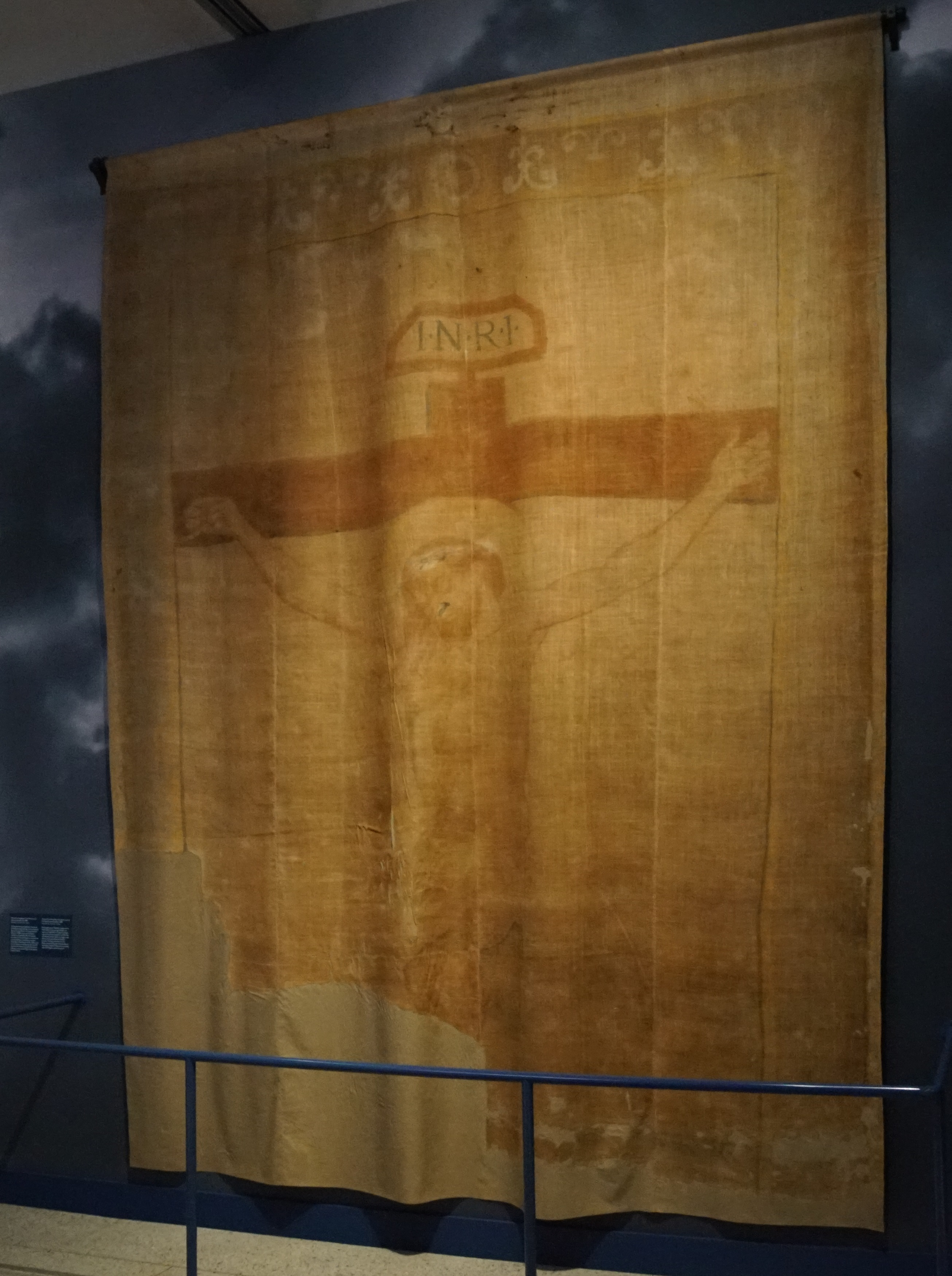
Banner from the Spanish galleon San Mateo, Museum De Lakenhal, Leiden

== Historiography ==
For 150 years, writers relied heavily on Augustine Ryther's translation of Petruccio Ubaldini's Expeditionis Hispaniorum in Angliam vera Descriptio (A discourse concerninge the Spanishe fleete inuadinge Englande in the yeare 1588) (1590), which argued that God decisively favoured the Protestant cause. In the 17th century, William Camden additionally pointed to elements of English nationalism and the private enterprise of the sea dogs. He also emphasized that the Duke of Medina Sidonia was an incompetent seaman. In the 18th century, David Hume praised the leadership of Queen Elizabeth. However, the Whig historians, led by James A. Froude, rejected Hume's interpretation and argued that Elizabeth was vacillating and almost lost the conflict by her unwillingness to spend enough to maintain and supply the Royal Navy's fleet of ships. Scientific modern historiography came of age with the publication of two volumes of primary documents by John Knox Laughton in 1894. This enabled the leading naval scholar of the day, Julian Corbett, to reject the Whig views and turn attention to the professionalization of the Royal Navy as a critical factor. Twentieth-century historians have focused on technical issues, such as the comparative power of English and Spanish naval guns and the degree of credit for naval battle tactics that is owed to Francis Drake and Charles Howard. Inclement weather in the English Channel and on the oceans at the time has always been cited as a major factor to the outcome. Historian Knerr has reviewed the main trends in historiography over five centuries.

== Notable participants ==
- William Adams served on the Richarde Dyffylde, a resupply ship during the campaign. In 1600, he was the first Englishman to reach (and settle in) Japan via the Dutch United East India Company (VOC) becoming one of the first of few Western samurai.
- Lope de Vega, one of the key figures in the Spanish Golden Age of Baroque literature, and one of the most prolific authors in the history of literature, served in the ship San Juan during the Spanish Armada.

== In popular culture ==
The armada has often featured in fictional accounts of the reign of Elizabeth I. Examples are:

- The Battle of Gravelines and the subsequent chase around the northern coast of Scotland form the climax of Charles Kingsley's 1855 novel Westward Ho!, which in 1925 became the first novel to be adapted into a radio drama by the BBC.
- John Brunner's 1962 science fiction novel Times Without Number depicts an alternate history where the Spanish Armada prevailed against England, leading to a global Spanish empire.
- The fifth episode of the BBC series Elizabeth R (1971) is an account of the defeat of the armada.
- The 2007 film Elizabeth: The Golden Age contains a heavily fictionalised retelling of the Spanish Armada and the Battle of Gravelines.
- In the 2017 novel A Column of Fire where the expedition is chronicled through viewpoints that shift between characters on the English and Spanish sides.

== See also ==
- Armada Memorial
- Armada Tapestries
- Invisible armada
- The Armada Service
- The English Mercurie
- 2nd Spanish Armada
- 3rd Spanish Armada
- 4th Spanish Armada
- Raid on Mounts Bay

== Bibliography ==
- Barratt, John (2006). Armada 1588 The Spanish Assault on England. Pen & Sword Books. ISBN 978-1781597033.
- Bicheno, Hugh. (2012). Elizabeth's Sea Dogs: How England's Mariners Became the Scourge of the Seas. Conway. ISBN 978-1844861743.
- Black, Jeremy (2005). European Warfare, 1494–1660 Warfare and History. Routledge. ISBN 978-1134477081.
- Bucholz, R O; Key, Newton (2009). Early modern England 1485–1714: a narrative history. John Wiley and Sons. ISBN 978-1405162753.
- Campion, G (2016). The Good Fight Battle of Britain Propaganda and The Few. London: Palgrave Macmillan. ISBN 978-0230291645.
- Churchill, Winston S. (1956). The New World. A History of the English-Speaking Peoples. Vol. 3. New York: Dodd, Mead & Co.
- Corbett, Julian S. (1898). Drake and the Tudor Navy: With a History of the Rise of England as a Maritime Power. Vol. I. New York: Longmans Green and Co. OCLC 630560466.
- Corbett, Julian S. (1917). Drake and the Tudor Navy: With a History of the Rise of England as a Maritime Power. Vol. II. New York: Longmans Green and Co. OCLC 1446267049.
- Coote, Stephen (2003). Drake, The Life and Legend of an Elizabethan Hero. London: Simon & Schuster UK Ltd. ISBN 978-0743220071.
- Cruikshank, Dan: Invasion: Defending Britain from Attack, Boxtree Ltd, 2002 ISBN 0752220292
- Casado Soto, José L (1991). "Atlantic shipping in sixteenth-century Spain and the 1588 Armada". In Rodríguez-Salgado, M J; Adams, Simon (eds.). England, Spain and the Gran Armada 1585–1604. Barnes & Noble. ISBN 0389209554.
- Elliott, J H (1982). Europe Divided (1559–1598). Cornell University Press. ISBN 978-8484326694.
- Fernández-Armesto, Felipe (1988). The Spanish Armada: The Experience of War in 1588. Oxford University Press. ISBN 0198229267.
- Fernández Duro, Cesáreo (1884). La Armada invencible. Vol. I. Madrid: Est. tipográfico "Sucesores de Rivadeneyra".
- Fernández Duro, Cesáreo (1885). La Armada invencible. Vol. II. Madrid: Est. tipográfico "Sucesores de Rivadeneyra".
- Froude, James Anthony. The Spanish Story of the Armada, and Other Essays (1899), by a leading historian of the 1890s full text online
- Gracia Rivas, Manuel; et al. (England, Spain and the Gran Armada, 1585–1604.) (1991). M. J. Rodríguez-Salgado, Simon Adams (ed.). The Medical Services of the Gran Armada. Barnes & Noble. ISBN 0389209554.
- Gracia Rivas, Manuel (1988). La sanidad en la jornada de Ingblaterra (1587–1588). Gran Armada. Vol. II. Madrid: Editorial Naval. ISBN 8473410394.
- Graham, Winston (1972). The Spanish Armadas. Collins. ISBN 978-0002218429.
- Gorrochategui Santos, Luis (2018). English Armada: The Greatest Naval Disaster in English History. Oxford: Bloomsbury. p. 253. ISBN 978-1350016996.
- Guy, John (2016). Elizabeth: The Forgotten Years. Penguin Books Limited. ISBN 978-0241963647.
- Hadfield, Alice Mary (1964). Time to Finish the Game The English and the Armada. Phoenix House. ISBN 978-7240009710.
- Hampden, John (1972). Francis Drake, privateer: contemporary narratives and documents. Taylor & Francis. ISBN 978-0817357030.
- Hanson, Neil (2011). The Confident Hope of a Miracle: The True History of the Spanish Armada'. Random House. ISBN 978-1446423226.
- Hardy, Evelyn (1966). Survivors of the Armada. Constable. ISBN 978-7240009727.
- Hart, Francis Rußel (1922). Admirals of the Caribbean. Boston: Houghton Mifflin Co. OCLC 1404776788.
- Hearn, Karen (2005). "Elizabeth I and the Spanish Armada: A Painting and its Afterlife". Transactions of the Royal Historical Society. Sixth Series. 14. Cambridge University Press. ISBN 978-0521849951.<
- Holmes, Richard (2006). A Guide to Battles Decisive Conflicts in History. OUP Oxford. ISBN 978-0191501173.
- Hutchinson, Robert (2013). The Spanish Armada. Weidenfeld & Nicolson. ISBN 978-0297866374.
- Israel, J. I.; Parker, G.; et al. (The Anglo-Dutch moment. Essays on the Glorious Revolution and its world impact.) (1991). Of Providence and Protestant Winds: the Spanish Armada of 1588 and the Dutch armada of 1688. Cambridge: Cambridge University Press. ISBN 0521390753..
- Johnson, Paul (1976). Elizabeth I : a study in Power and Intellect. London: Omega. ISBN 0860077330.
- Kamen, Henry (2014). Spain, 1469–1714: A Society of Conflict. London: Routledge. ISBN 9781408271933.
- Kilfeather T. P.: Ireland: Graveyard of the Spanish Armada, Anvil Books Ltd, 1967
- Knerr, Douglas. "Through the "Golden Mist": a Brief Overview of Armada Historiography." American Neptune 1989 49(1): 5–13. ISSN 0003-0155
- Konstam, Angus (2009). The Spanish Armada: The Great Enterprise against England 1588. Bloomsbury. ISBN 978-1846034961.
- Lambert, Andrew (2010). "2 The Defeat of the Spanish Armada 1588. Prose Epic of the modern English nation". In McKeown, Simon (ed.). The International Emblem From Incunabula to the Internet : Selected Proceedings of the Eighth International Conference of the Society for Emblem Studies, 28th July–1st August, 2008, Winchester College. Cambridge Scholars Publisher. ISBN 978-1443820066.
- Laughton, John Knox (1894). State papers relating to the defeat of the Spanish Armada, anno 1588. Navy Record Society. Publications,vol.1-2. Vol. II. London: Navy Records Society.
- Lewis, Michael (1960). Spanish Armada. Batsford. ISBN 978-7240009789.
- Mcdermott, James (2005). England and the Spanish Armada: The Necessary Quarrel. New Haven, CT: Yale University Press. ISBN 978-0300106985.
- Maltby, William S (1971). The Black Legend in England. Durham: Duke University Press. ISBN 978-0822302506.
- Marek y Villarino de Brugge, André (2020c). 1578-1582. Alessandro Farnese: Prince of Parma: Governor-General of the Netherlands (1545–1592). Vol. III. Los Angeles: MJV Enterprises, ltd., inc. ISBN 979-8688759655.
- Marek y Villarino de Brugge, André (2020e). 1585-1592. Alessandro Farnese: Prince of Parma: Governor-General of the Netherlands (1545–1592). Vol. V. Los Angeles: MJV Enterprises, ltd., inc. ISBN 979-8689560397.
- Martin, Colin; Parker, Geoffrey (1999). The Spanish Armada (Revised). Manchester University Press. ISBN 978-1901341140.
- Martin, Colin (with appendices by Wignall, Sydney): Full Fathom Five: Wrecks of the Spanish Armada (with appendices by Sydney Wignall), Viking, 1975
- Martin, Paula (1988). Spanish Armada Prisoners The Story of the Nuestra Señora Del Rosario and Her Crew, and of Other Prisoners in England, 1587–97. University of Exeter. ISBN 978-0859893053.
- Mattingly, Garrett (1963). The Invincible Armada and Elizabethan England. Ithaca, New York: Cornell University Press.
- Mattingly, Garrett (2005). The Armada. Houghton Mifflin. ISBN 978-0618565917.
- Motley, John Lothrop (1888). from the Death of William the Silent to the Twelve Years' Truce – 1609. History of the United Netherlands. Vol. I. Harper & Brothers.
- Parker, Geoffrey (1996). "The 'Dreadnought' Revolution of Tudor England". Mariner's Mirror. 82 (3): 269–300. doi:10.1080/00253359.1996.10656603.
- Parker, Geoffrey; et al. (The New Cambridge Modern History) (1980). "Warfare". Companion Volume. Vol. XIII. Cambridge: Cambridge University Press. ISBN 0-521-22128-5.
- Parker, Geoffrey (2002). Success is never final. New York: Basic Books. ISBN 0-465-05477-3.
- Parker, Geoffrey (May 1988). "Why the Armada Failed". History Today. Vol. 38, no. 5. pp. 26–33.
- Pendrill, Colin (2002). Spain 1474–1700:The Triumphs and Tribulations of Empire. Bristol: Heinemann. ISBN 978-0435327330.
- Pettegree, Andrew (2015). The Invention of News. Yale University Press. ISBN 978-0300212761.
- Pierson, Peter. Commander of the Armada: The Seventh Duke of Medina Sidonia. (1989). 304 pp.
- Pollen, John Hungerford (1907). "The Spanish Armada". The Catholic Encyclopedia An International Work of Reference on the Constitution, Doctrine, Discipline, and History of the Catholic Church. Vol. I. New York City: Robert Appleton Company.
- Rasor, Eugene L. The Spanish Armada of 1588: Historiography and Annotated Bibliography. (1992). 277 pp.
- Regan, Geoffrey (1992). The Guinness Book of Military Anecdotes. Canopy Books. ISBN 978-1558594418.
- Rodgers, N. A. M. (2004). The Safeguard of the Sea: A Naval History of Britain, 660–1649. London: Penguin. ISBN 9780393045796.
- Rodríguez-Salgado, M. J.; et al. (England, Spain and the Gran Armada, 1585–1604) (1991). M. J. Rodríguez-Salgado, Simon Adams (ed.). Pilots, navigation and strategy in the Gran Armada. Barnes & Noble. ISBN 9780859763004.
- Rodríguez-Salgado, M. J (1990). "The Spanish Story of the 1588 Armada Reassessed". The Historical Journal. 33 (2): 461–478. doi:10.1017/S0018246X00013431. JSTOR 2639468. S2CID 161344071.
- Stedall, Robert (2022). Elizabeth I's Final Years Her Favourites and Her Fighting Men. Pen and Sword. ISBN 978-1399083188.
- Tenace, Edward (2003), "A Strategy of Reaction: The Armadas of 1596 and 1597 and the Spanish Struggle for European Hegemony", English Historical Review, 118 (478): 855–882, doi:10.1093/ehr/118.478.855
- Thompson, I. A. A. "The Appointment of the Duke of Medina Sidonia to the Command of the Spanish Armada", The Historical Journal, Vol. 12, No. 2. (1969), pp. 197–216. in JSTOR
- Wagner, John (1999). Historical Dictionary of the Elizabethan World; Britain, Ireland, Europe, and America. Oxford and New York: Routledge. ISBN 978-1579582692.
- Waller, Maureen (2006). Sovereign Ladies: The Six Reigning Queens of England. New York: St. Martin's Press. ISBN 978-0312338015.
- Weduwen, Arthur der (2026). The Last Invasion of England: 1688 and the Dutch Armada. Princeton University Press. ISBN 9780691263441.
- Wernham, R.B (1984). After the Armada: Elizabethan England and the Struggle for Western Europe : 1588–1595. Clarendon Press. ISBN 978-0198227533.
- Worth, Richard (1890). History of Plymouth: From the Earliest Period to the Present Time. Plymouth: W. Benden. OCLC 4910517.
- Vego, Milan N (2013). Naval Strategy and Operations in Narrow Seas. Routledge. ISBN 978-1136317941.
- Alcalá-Zamora, José N. (2004). La empresa de Inglaterra: (la "Armada invencible" : fabulación y realidad). Taravilla: Real Academia de la Historia ISBN 978-8495983374
