= May (surname) =

Origin
- Origin: Angle, Saxon & Gaelic
- Region of origin: Germany, Scotland

Other names
- Variant forms: Maye, Mayer, Mayes, Moyes, Mays, Myers, Meir, Meier, Meyer, Mayhew, Maynard, Meynell

May is a surname of Germanic (Saxon) and, independently, of Gaelic origin. There are many variants used in English-speaking countries, as well as several variants used in Germany. The Scottish May is a sept of Clan Donald. The surname "May" remains a common surname in the United States, England, Scotland, Ireland, Canada, Germany, Australia and New Zealand, as well as among Russians of German origin; possibly also persisting in areas of the Netherlands and France.

People with the surname May include:

== A ==
- Aaron May (born 2001), American rapper
- Abbe May (born 1983), Australian musician and human rights campaigner
- Abigail (Abba) May Alcott (1800–1877), American activist
- Abigail Williams May (1829–1888), American social reformer
- Adam May (footballer) (born 1997), English footballer
- Adam May (sailor) (born 1976), British competitive sailor
- Adam May (television reporter), American television news anchor and reporter
- Alan May (born 1965), Canadian ice hockey player
- Alan Nunn May (1911–2003), British physicist and Soviet spy
- Aleali May (born 1992), American fashion stylist and model
- Alfie May (born 1993), English footballer
- Algernon May (died 1704), English Member of Parliament
- Alice May (1847–1887), English singer and actress
- Allen May (born 1969), American racecar driver
- Alonzo B. May (1906–1968), American professor of economics
- Alston May (1869–1940), English Anglican bishop
- Alysia May (born 1971), American tennis player
- Andrew May (historian) (born 1963), Australian social historian
- Andrew J. May (1875–1959), American politician from Kentucky
- Andy May (footballer, born 1964) (born 1964), English footballer
- Andy May (footballer, born 1989) (born 1989), Luxembourgish footballer
- Andy May (presenter) (born 1987), British TV and radio broadcaster
- Ann May (Ann Beatrice Sullivan; 1898–1985), American actress
- Anna May-Rychter (1864–1955), German painter
- Anne May (born 1961), German literary scholar and librarian
- Anthony May (1946–2021), British actor
- Anthony May (judge) (1940–2024), British judge
- Archie May (born 2004), Australian rules footballer
- Art May (born 1948), American football player
- Arthur May (died 1968), American historian and academic
- Arthur Johan May (1903–1979), Surinamese civil servant and politician
- Attila May (born 1942), Hungarian fencer
- Axel May (born 1948), German competitive sailor

== B ==
- Bailey May (born 2002), Filipino-British actor and singer
- Baptist May (1628–1698), English courtier
- Barbara May, American Apache politician and social worker
- Barry May (born 1944), English cricketer
- Ben May (footballer) (born 1984), English footballer
- Ben May (rugby union) (born 1982), New Zealand rugby union footballer
- Ben May (umpire) (born 1982), American baseball umpire
- Ben E. May (1889–1972), American businessman and philanthropist
- Bernie May (geneticist) (born 1947), American geneticist
- Bernie May (politician) (born 1941), British entrepreneur and politician
- Beth May (born 1992), American podcast host
- Bettina May (born 1979), Canadian-American pin-up model and burlesque dancer
- Betty May (1894–1980), British model
- Betty May (actress) (1904–1949), American actress
- Bill May (American football, fl. 1913–15), American football player
- Bill May (American football, born 1913) (1913–2004), American football player
- Bill May (soccer) (born 1974), American soccer player
- Bill May (synchronized swimmer) (born 1979), American synchronized swimmer
- Bill May (Washington politician) (1902–1989), American politician
- Billy May (1916–2004), American composer, arranger and trumpeter
- Billy May (footballer) (1865–1936), English footballer
- Bob May (actor) (1939–2009), American actor and stuntman
- Bob May (golfer) (born 1968), American professional golfer
- Bob May (ice hockey) (1927–2014), Canadian ice hockey player and coach
- Bob May (politician) (1909–1986), Australian politician
- Bobby May (Ludwig Theodore Mayer; 1907–1981), American juggler
- Brad May (born 1971), Canadian ice hockey player
- Brenda May (1917–1998), New Zealand entomologist
- Brian May (born 1947), English musician
- Brian May (Australian composer) (1934–1997), Australian film composer
- Bryan May (born 1974), Canadian politician
- Buckshot May (William Herbert May; 1899–1984), American baseball player
- Butch May (Robert Stanley May, Jr.; born 1941), American volleyball player
- Butler May (1894–1917), American vaudeville performer

== C ==
- Carey May (born 1959), Irish long-distance runner
- Carl R. May (born 1961), British sociologist
- Carlos May (born 1948), American baseball player
- Caroline May (c.1820–1895, English-American poet, editor and literary critic
- Catherine Dean May (1914–2004), American politician from Washington State
- Chad May (born 1971), American football player
- Charles May (bishop), South African Anglican priest
- Charles May (Canadian politician) (1858–1932), Canadian politician
- Charles May (industrialist) (1801–1860), English chemist, engineer and astronomer
- Charles May (police officer) (died 1879), British police officer in Hong Kong
- Charles A. May (1818–1864), United States Army officer
- Charles E. May, American literary scholar
- Charles S. May (1830–1901), American politician from Michigan
- Charlie May (footballer) (1899–1989), Australian rules footballer and coach
- Charmian May (1937–2002), English actress
- Choriza May, Spanish-British drag queen
- Christine May (born 1948), Scottish politician
- Christof May (1973–2022), German Catholic theologian and priest
- Christopher May, American politician from Indiana
- Chumisa Dornford-May (born 2002/3), South African-British actress
- Clark W. May (1869–1908), American politician from West Virginia
- Claude May (1913–2009), French actress
- Cliff May (1903–1989), American architect
- Clifford May (born 1951), American journalist and political activist
- Cordelia Scaife May (1928–2005), American heiress and philanthropist
- Corey May, American video game writer
- Corinna May (born 1970), German singer
- Cornelius Jacobsen May, Dutch sea captain of the 17th century
- Corrinne May (born 1973), Singaporean musician
- Cyril May (1929–2026), Australian-born American country musician
- Cyril May (socialist) (1920–2003), British socialist

== D ==
- Dan May (1898–1982), American businessman and activist
- Dan Earl May (1952–2019), American artist
- Daniel Boone May (born 1852), American gunfighter
- Danny May (born 1988), English footballer
- Darrell May (born 1972), American baseball player
- Darrell May (ice hockey) (born 1962), Canadian ice hockey player
- Dave May (1943–2012), American baseball player
- David May (computer scientist) (born 1951), British computer scientist
- David May (footballer) (born 1970), English footballer and coach
- David May (journalist) (1948–2019), English investigative journalist and editor
- David May (merchant) (1848–1927), American businessman
- David N. May (born 1971), American judge in Iowa
- David W. May, United States Air Force officer
- Dean May (born 1962), American football player
- Dean L. May (1938–2003), American historian
- Deborah May (born 1948), American actress and model
- Deems May (born 1969), American football player
- Dent May (born 1985), American singer-songwriter
- Derek May (1932–1992), Canadian film director
- Derrick May (baseball) (born 1968), American baseball player and coach
- Derrick May (musician) (born 1963), American electronic musician
- Deven May (born 1971), American actor
- Dick May (1930–2009), American racing driver
- Dick May (footballer) (1910–1986), Australian rules footballer
- Don May (basketball) (born 1946), American basketball player
- Don May (politician) (1924–2001), Australian politician from Western Australia
- Donald May (1929–2022), American actor
- Doris May (1902–1984), American actress
- Dustin May (born 1997), American baseball player
- Dusty May (born 1976), American basketball coach
- Dwight May (1822–1880), American politician

== E ==
- Earl May (1927–2008), American jazz bassist
- Eddie May (1943–2012), English footballer and manager
- Eddie May (Scottish footballer) (born 1967), Scottish footballer and coach
- Edgar May (1929–2012), American politician from Vermont
- Edith May (Anne Drinker; 1827–1903), American writer
- Edmund May (1876–1956), German architect
- Edna May (1878–1948), American actress and singer
- Eduard May (1905–1956), German biologist, natural philosopher and entomologist
- Edward Collett May (1806–1887), English music educator
- Edward Harrison May (1824–1887), British-American painter
- E. J. May (Edward John May; 1853–1941), British architect
- Edward Ralph May (1819–1852), American lawyer and politician from Indiana
- Sir Edward May, 2nd Baronet (died 1814), Irish politician
- Edwin May (architect) (1823–1880), American architect
- Edwin H. May Jr. (1924–2002), American politician from Connecticut
- Ego Ella May (born 1992), British-Nigerian musician
- Ela Q. May (born c.1890), British child actress
- Elaine May (born 1932), American actress and comedian
- Elizabeth May (born 1954), Canadian politician
- Elizabeth May (author) (born 1987), American fantasy author
- Elizabeth May (triathlete) (born 1983), Luxembourgish triathlete
- Elizabeth Eckhardt May (1899–1996), American home economist
- Elizabeth Stoffregen May (1907–2011), American economist and advocate of female education
- Emil May (1850–1933), German engineer
- Ernest May (athlete) (1878–1952), British athlete
- Ernest R. May (1928–2009), American historian
- Ernst May (1886–1970), German architect and city planner
- Erskine May (1815–1886), British official and constitutional theorist
- Eva May (1902–1924), Austrian actress

== F ==
- Fiona May (born 1969), British-Italian long jumper
- Florence Lewis May (1899–1988), American art historian
- Francis Henry May (1860–1922), British colonial administrator
- Francisco May (1884–1969), Indigenous Mayan soldier
- Frank May (cashier), Chief Cashier of the Bank of England from 1873 to 1893
- Frank May (cricketer) (1862–1907), English cricketer and stockbroker
- Fred May (1917–1945), Australian rugby league footballer
- Fred O. May (died 2008), American politician from Washington State
- Frederick May (academic) (1921–1976), Australian professor of Italian
- Frederick May (composer) (1911–1985), Irish composer
- Friedrich May (born 1947), German competitive sailor

== G ==
- Gabby May (born 1993), Canadian artistic gymnast
- Gareth May (born 1996), South African water polo player
- Gary May (footballer) (born 1967), English footballer
- Gary S. May (born 1964), American electrical engineer and academic
- George May (footballer, born 1875) (1875–1950), Australian rules footballer
- George May (footballer, born 1891) (1891–1920), Australian rules footballer
- George Augustus Chichester May (18151892), Irish judge
- George Samuel May (1858–1922), Canadian politician from Ontario
- George A. May (1872–1948), American gymnast, trainer and academic
- George O. May (1875–1961), American accountant
- George S. May (1890–1962), American businessman
- George May, 1st Baron May (1871–1946), British financial expert and public servant
- Gerald May (1940–2005), American psychiatrist
- Geraldine Pratt May (1895–1997), American air force officer
- Gerd May (born 1953), German fencer
- Gisela May (1924–2016), German actress and singer
- Gregory C. May, American diplomat and former journalist
- Glenn Anthony May (1945–2020), American historian
- Graham May (1952–2006), New Zealand weightlifter
- Greg May (born 1985), American college ice hockey coach
- Guillermo May (born 1998), Uruguayan footballer
- Gustave May (1881–1943), Canadian photographer and politician

== H ==
- Hans May (1886–1958), Austrian film composer
- Harry May (1892–1972), Australian politician from Western Australia
- Harry May (footballer) (1928–2007), British footballer
- Helen May (born 1947), New Zealand education academic
- Helen Neale-May, South African politician
- Hellmut May (1921–2011), Austrian figure skater
- Henriette May (1862–1928), German Jewish women's activist
- Henry May (American politician) (1816–1866), American politician from Maryland
- Henry May (co-operative activist) (1867–1939), British co-operative movement activist
- Henry May (New Zealand politician) (1912–1995), New Zealand politician
- Henry May (VC) (1885–1941), recipient of the Victoria Cross, Scottish soldier
- Henry Allan Roughton May (1863–1930), British Army officer
- Henry F. May (1915–2012), American historian
- Hugh May (1621–1684), English architect
- Hugh May (footballer) (1882–1944), Scottish footballer
- Humphrey May (1573–1630), English courtier and Member of Parliament

== I ==
- Iba May (born 1998), German footballer
- Illana May (born 1976), South African musician
- Imelda May (born 1974), Irish singer and musician
- Irma May (born 1899), Polish social reformer and humanitarian
- Isabel May (born 2000), American actress
- Isabella May (1850–1926), New Zealand temperance worker and suffragist

== J ==
- Jack May (1922–1997), English actor
- Jack May (tennis) (John Bernard May; 1925–2012), Australian tennis player
- Jacob May (born 1992), American baseball player
- Jacquetta May, British writer, actress and theatre director
- Jakie May (1895–1970), American baseball player
- Jamaal May (born 1982), American poet from Detroit
- James May (born 1963), English television presenter and journalist
- James May (footballer) (born 1877), Scottish footballer
- James May (gymnast) (born 1968), British gymnast
- James May (vascular surgeon) (1934-2021), Australian vascular surgeon
- James Vance May (1873–1947), American physician
- Sir James May, 1st Baronet (1723–1811), Anglo-Irish politician
- James Disney-May (born 1992), British swimmer
- Jan May (born 1995), German cyclist
- Javier May (born 1966), Mexican politician
- Jenise May, American politician
- Jerry May (baseball) (1943–1996), American baseball player
- Jesse May (born 1971), American poker player and commentator
- Jessica May (born 1993), Brazilian-Turkish actress and model
- Jim May (Australian footballer) (1910–1979), Australian rules footballer
- Jim May (chemical engineer) (1934–2023), Australian chemical engineer and metallurgist
- Jim May (soccer) (born 1953), American soccer player and coach
- Jim May (tennis) (born 1981), British tennis player
- Jodhi May (born 1975), British actress
- Joe May (1880–1954), Austrian film director
- Brother Joe May (1912–1972), American gospel singer
- Joe D. May, American educator and academic administrator
- Joe T. May (born 1937), American politician
- Johann Friedrich May (1697–1762), German political scientist
- John May (angel investor), American venture capitalist
- John May (architect), American architect and cultural theorist
- John May (Australian footballer) (born 1951), Australian rules footballer
- John May (Australian politician) (1844–1917), Australian politician from Queensland
- John May (bishop) (died 1598), English academic and churchman
- John May (cricketer) (born 1845), English cricketer
- John May (footballer, born 1878) (1878–1933), Scottish footballer
- John May (judge) (1923–1997), British judge
- John May (Medal of Honor) (1836–1886), American soldier, recipient of the Medal of Honor
- John May (North Carolina politician) (1950–2017), American politician from North Carolina
- John May (police officer) (1775–1855), British police commander
- John May (priest) (died 1893), Anglican Dean in British Guiana
- John May (shipwright) (1694–1779), English shipwright
- John May (youth worker) (born 1964), British youth worker
- John Wilder May (1819–1883), American jurist and judge
- John L. May (1922–1994), American Catholic prelate
- Johnny May (born 1945), Canadian bush pilot
- J. Peter May (Jon Peter May; born 1939), American mathematician
- Jonathan May (1958–2010), American cellist and conductor
- Jonny May (born 1990), England rugby union footballer
- Joseph May, British actor
- Joseph May (politician) (1816–1890), New Zealand politician
- Julia Harris May (1833–1912), American poet and educator
- Julian May (1931–2017), American writer
- Julie May (born 1964), English cricketer
- Julie von May (von Rued) (1808–1875), Swiss feminist
- Juliet May, British television director
- Juliet May (judge) (born 1961), British barrister and judge
- Jürgen May (born 1942), German middle-distance runner

== K ==
- Karen May (born 1944), American politician from Illinois
- Karl May (1842–1912), German author
- Karl-Maria May (1886–1963), Austrian painter
- Karla May (born 1970), American politician from Missouri
- Katherine May (born 1977), British author and podcaster
- Kathy May (born 1956), American tennis player
- Katie May (1981–2016), American model
- Ken May, American business executive
- Kenneth O. May (1915–1977), American mathematician and historian of mathematics
- Kenny May (born 1970), American bicycle motocross rider
- Kevin May, American college football coach
- Kiley May (born 1986/7), Canadian Hotinonhshón:ni Mohawk actor, writer and educator
- Kimberley May (born 2003), New Zealand middle-distance runner
- Kristen May (born 1982), American singer
- Kristina May (born 1987), Canadian beach volleyball player
- Kurt May (1896–1992), Israeli director of the United Restitution Organization

== L ==
- Lady May (Namibian singer) (born 1986), Namibian singer
- Lady May (rapper) (Rhonda Natasha Robinson; born 1974), American rapper, singer and songwriter
- Larry May (footballer) (born 1958), English footballer
- Larry May (philosopher), American philosopher and author
- LaRuby May (born 1975), American politician and lawyer
- Lee May (1943–2017), American baseball player and coach
- Leigh Martin May (born 1971), American judge from Georgia
- Len May (1899–1959), Australian rules footballer
- Les May (born 1934), Australian rules footballer
- Lindsay May, Australian competitive sailor
- Liz Marty May (born 1961), American politician from South Dakota
- Lola May (May Purman; 1889–1971), American actress
- Lola J. May (1923–2007), American mathematics educator
- Lucas May (born 1984), American baseball player
- Luke May (born 1989), English rugby league footballer
- Luke S. May (1892–1965), American forensic scientist
- Lyn May (born 1952), Mexican actress and vedette

== M ==
- Mabel May (1877–1971), Canadian artist
- Mabel May (actress) (1892–1957), British-South African actress
- Mabel May-Yong (born 1884), German actress
- Mac May (born 1999), American volleyball player
- Marc May (born 1956), American football player
- Marcella May (1922–2014), American figure skater
- Márcio May (born 1972), Brazilian cyclist
- Margaret May (born 1950), Australian politician from Queensland
- Margaret T. May, British health sciences modeller
- Margery Land May (1897–1932), American writer
- Maria May (1900–1968), German textiles designer and academic
- Mariah May (born 1998), English professional wrestler
- Mark May (born 1959), American football player and broadcaster
- Mark Dornford-May, South African theatre and film director
- Marta May (born 1939), Spanish actress
- Martin May (actor) (born 1961), German actor
- Martin O. May (1922–1945), United States Army Medal of Honor recipient
- Mathilda May (born 1965), French actress
- Matt May (1935–2010), American football player, coach, and administrator
- Matthew E. May, American author
- Maureen May (born 1962), American cellist and conductor
- Meagan May (born 1991), American softball player
- Melinda Piket-May, American engineer and academic
- Melissa S. May, American judge in Indiana
- Mia May (1884–1980), Austrian actress
- Michaela May (born 1952), German film and television actress
- Michael May (cricketer) (born 1971), English cricketer
- Michael May (racing driver) (born 1934), Swiss racing driver
- Michael M. May (1925–2026), American theoretical physicist
- Michaela May (born 1952), German film and television actress
- Mike May (Iowa politician) (born 1945), American politician from Iowa
- Mike May (skier) (born 1953), American para-alpine skier
- Milt May (born 1950), American baseball player and coach
- Mitchell May (1870–1961), American politician from New York State
- Mona May, American costume designer
- Morton D. May (1914–1983), American philanthropist and art collector
- Muriel May (1897–1982), New Zealand school principal and writer

== N ==
- Nataliya May (born 1968), Ukrainian singer
- Ngarralja Tommy May (1935–2022), Aboriginal Australian artist
- Nick May (born 1988), Canadian motorcycle racer
- Nicolas May (1927–2006), Luxembourgish footballer
- Nikki May, Anglo-Nigerian novelist
- Niklas May (born 2002), German footballer
- Norma May, English bowls player
- Norman May (1928–2016), Australian sports broadcaster
- Norman May (wrestler) (1917–1993), Canadian wrestler
- Norrie May-Welby, Scottish-Australian transgender person

== O ==
- Olive May (1871–1938), American actress
- Olive May (Filipino actress) (born 2004), Filipino actress, singer and model
- Orley May (1897–1968), American detective

== P ==
- Pamela May (1917–2005), British dancer
- Patricia May, Chilean anthropologist
- Patsy May (born 1947), Australian cricketer
- Paul May (1909–1976), German film director
- Paul May (footballer) (born 1935), Luxembourgish footballer
- Pauliina May (born 1967), Finnish-Dutch vocalist
- Percy May (cricketer) (1884–1965), English cricketer
- Percy May (gymnast) (1927–1977), British gymnast
- Peter May (cricketer) (1929–1994), English cricketer
- Peter May (weightlifter) (born 1966), British weightlifter
- Peter May (writer) (1951–2026), Scottish writer
- Peter W. May (born 1943/4), American businessman
- Phil May (athlete) (1944–2014), Australian long and triple jumper
- Phil May (caricaturist) (1864–1903), English illustrator and caricaturist
- Phil May (rugby union) (born 1956), Wales rugby union footballer
- Phil May (singer) (1944–2020), English vocalist
- Philip May (born 1957), British investment manager, husband of Theresa May
- Pinky May (Merrill Glend May; 1911–2000), American baseball player

== R ==
- Rachel May (born 1957), American academic and politician from New York State
- Ralphie May (1972–2017), American comedian
- Randy May (born 2000), Indonesian footballer
- Ray May (born 1945), American football player
- Rebecca May (born 2002), English footballer
- Reginald May (1879–1958), British Army general
- Reuben May (1815–1902), American farmer and politician from Wisconsin
- Richard May (cricketer) (died c.1796), English cricketer
- Richard May (judge) (1938-2004), British judge
- Richard May (politician) (c.1638 – 1713), English politician
- Richard May (speedway rider) (born 1944), British motorcycle speedway racer
- Rick May (1940–2020), Canadian-American actor
- Ricky May (1943–1988), Australian jazz singer
- Ricky May (harness racing), New Zealand standardbred racehorse driver
- Rita May (actress) (born 1942), English actress
- Rob May (born 1969), English musician
- Robert May (cook) (1588 – c. 1664), English chef and writer
- Robert May (producer), American film producer
- Robert Hobart May (born c.1801), Indigenous Tasmanian
- RJ May (born 1986), American former politician and convicted child sex offender
- Robert C. May, American philosopher
- Robert G. May, American accountant and academic administrator
- Robert H. May (1822–1903), American politician from Georgia
- Robert L. May (1905–1976), American retailer and writer
- Robert May, Baron May of Oxford (1936–2020), Australian scientist, president of the Royal Society
- Rollo May (1909–1994), American psychologist
- Ron May (columnist) (1956–2013), American journalist
- Ron May (politician) (born 1934), American politician
- Rosalind Reekie-May (born 1972), New Zealand cyclist
- Rüdiger May (born 1974), German boxer
- Rudy May (1944–2024), American baseball player
- Rufus May (born 1968), British clinical psychologist
- Ruth May (nurse) (born 1967), British nurse administrator

== S ==
- Saidie May (1879–1951), American art collector
- Sally Kate May (born 1979), Australian archaeologist and anthropologist
- Samantha May (born 1987), Australian netball player
- Samuel Joseph May (1797–1871), American reformer
- Sarah May, English novelist
- Scott May (born 1954), American basketball player
- Scott May (baseball) (born 1961), American baseball player
- Sean May (born 1984), American basketball player and coach
- Seth May (1802–1881), American judge
- Shannon May (born 1991), Australian soccer player
- Sherriden May (born 1973), American football player
- Simon May (born 1944), British composer
- Sophie May (singer) (born 1999), English musician
- Søren Nielsen May (died 1679), Danish priest
- Stacy May-Johnson, American softball player and coach
- Stan May (born 1959), American politician from Oklahoma
- Steph Hodgins-May (born 1985), Australian politician and climate activist
- Stephen May (novelist) (born 1964), British novelist, playwright and TV writer
- Stephen May (politician) (1931–2016), American politician
- Steve May (born 1971), American politician from Arizona
- Steven May (born 1992), Australian rules footballer
- Steven W. May, American academic
- Stevie May (born 1992), Scottish footballer
- Suzanne May, British actress

== T ==
- Taylan May (born 2001), Samoa rugby league footballer
- Ted May (1949–2020), American television director
- Teddy May (1865–1941), English footballer
- Terrell May (born 1999), Samoa rugby league footballer
- Theresa May, Prime Minister of the United Kingdom from 2016 to 2019
- Therese May (born 1943), American artist
- Thomas May (1594/5–1650), English poet, dramatist and historian
- Thomas May (archaeologist) (1842–1931), English archaeologist
- Thomas May (cricketer), English cricketer in the 18th century
- Thomas May (MP for Chichester) (c.1645–1718), English politician
- Thomas May (Royalist) (c.1604–1655), English politician
- Tim May (born 1962), Australian cricketer
- Timothy C. May (1951–2018), American writer, engineer and scientist
- Tina May (1961–2022), British jazz vocalist
- Todd May (born 1955), American political philosopher
- Tom May (mycologist), Australian mycologist
- Thomas May (Royalist) (c.1604–1655), English politician
- Tom May (rugby union) (born 1979), England rugby union footballer
- Tony May (born 1954), Australian rules footballer
- Torsten May (born 1969), German boxer
- Tracy Brown-May (born 1967), American politician from Nevada
- Travis May (born 1987), American entrepreneur
- Trevor May (born 1989), American baseball player
- Tyrone May (born 1996), Samoa rugby league footballer

== V ==
- Val May (1927–2012), English theatre director
- Valerie May (1916–2007), Australian botanist
- Victoria May, Baroness Plunket (1873–1968), Canadian nursing association founder
- Vladimir May-Mayevsky (1867–1920), Russian military leader

== W ==
- Wally May (1926–2011), Australian rules footballer and coach
- Walt May (Otto A. May; 1898–1972), American football player
- Walter Barton May (1783–1855), British industrialist
- Walter G. May (1918–2015), Canadian engineer and academic
- Wanita May (born 1975), Canadian high jumper
- Warren May (born 1964), English footballer
- William May (artistic director) (1953–2009), Australian artistic director, theatre producer and composer
- William May (cricketer) (died 1888), English cricketer
- William May (Northern Ireland politician) (1909–1962), Northern Ireland politician
- William May (MP for Tavistock), English Member of Parliament for Tavistock, 1413–1421
- William May (pirate) (fl.1689–1700), Rhode Island pirate in the Indian Ocean
- William May (Royal Navy officer) (1849–1930), Royal Navy Admiral of the Fleet
- William May (theologian) (died 1560), English cleric and academic
- William Charles May (1853–1931), English sculptor and painter
- William E. May (1928–2014), American theologian
- W. E. May (William Edward May; 1899–1989), Royal Navy officer
- William F. May (chemical engineer) (1915–2011), American chemical engineer and businessman
- William F. May (ethicist) (1927–2023), American ethicist
- William L. May (c.1793–1849), American politician from Illinois
- William W. May (1887–1979), American athlete
- Willie May (1936–2012), American hurdler
- Wong May (born 1944), Chinese poet
- Woody May (1929–1995), American politician from Kentucky
- Wop May (Wilfrid Reid May; 1896–1952), Canadian flying ace

== Z ==
- Zakhar May (born 1969), Ukrainian musician

== See also ==
- Chicago May (1871–1929), Irish criminal
- Rosa May (1855–1911/2), American prostitute
- Mabel and Kate King-May
- Maye (disambiguation)
- Mays (disambiguation)
- Mayne (disambiguation)
- Mayhew (disambiguation)
- Maybery
- Maynard (disambiguation)
- Mayall (disambiguation)
- Mey (disambiguation)
- Meynell
- Majewski, Polish surname
- Demay
- Lemay
