= Robert May =

Robert, Bob or Rob May may refer to:

== Arts and entertainment ==
- Robert L. May (1905–1976), American creator of Rudolph the Red-Nosed Reindeer
- Bobby May (1907–1981), American juggler
- Bob May (actor) (1939–2009), American actor
- Rob May (born 1969), English musician
- Robert May (producer) American filmmaker, producer and director

== Politicians ==
- Robert John "RJ" May (born 1986), American politician and criminal
- Robert H. May (1822–1903), American politician, mayor of Augusta, Georgia
- Bob May (politician) (1909–1986), Australian politician

== Others ==
- Robert May (cook) (1588 – c. 1664), English chef
- Robert Hobart May (c.1801–?1832), Aboriginal Tasmanian massacre survivor
- Bob May (ice hockey) (1927–2014), Canadian ice hockey player and coach
- Robert May, Baron May of Oxford (1936–2020), Australian biologist
- Bob May (golfer) (born 1968), American professional golfer
- Robert C. May, American philosopher
- Robert G. May, American academic administrator

== See also ==
- Robert May's School, Odiham, Hampshire, England
