= Daniel May =

Daniel May may refer to:

- Daniel Boone May (1852–1878), American gunfighter
- Dan Earl May (1952–2019), American artist
- Daniel May (composer), American composer of film and television music, brother of Jonathan May
- Dan May (1898–1982), American business, educational and civic leader
- Danny May (born 1988), English footballer
- Daniel May (politician) (born 1981), German politician

== See also ==
- Daniel Mays (born 1978), English actor
