= George May =

George May may refer to:

- George Augustus Chichester May (1815–1892), Irish judge
- George May, 1st Baron May (1871–1946), British financial expert and public servant
- George A. May (1872–1948), American athletic trainer and administrator
- George O. May (1875–1961), American accountant
- George S. May (1890–1962), American businessman and golf entrepreneur
- George Samuel May (1858–1922), Canadian merchant and politician
- George May (footballer, born 1891) (1891–1920), Australian rules footballer for Richmond
- George May (footballer, born 1875) (1875–1950), Australian rules footballer for St Kilda

== See also ==
- George May Keim (1805–1861), American politician
- George May Phelps (1820–1888), American telegraphy inventor
- George Maye, MP for Canterbury
