= Bernie May =

Bernie May may refer to:

- Bernie May (politician)
- Bernie May (geneticist)
