= Stephen May =

Stephen or Steven May may refer to:

- Stevie May (born 1992), Scottish professional footballer
- Stephen May (politician) (1931–2016), American lawyer, mayor of Rochester and member of the Reagan administration
- Steven May (born 1992), Australian rules footballer
- Steve May, member of the Arizona House of Representatives
- Steven W. May, specialist in Renaissance poetry
- Stephen May (novelist) (born 1964), British novelist
