= Andy May =

Andy or Andrew May may refer to:

- Andrew J. May (1875–1959), American politician
- Andy May (footballer, born 1964), English professional footballer
- Andy May (footballer, born 1989), Luxembourg international footballer
- Andrew May (historian), Australian historian
- Andy May (presenter) (born 1987), English TV and radio presenter
