= Nigel Sylvester =

American professional BMX athlete (born 1987)

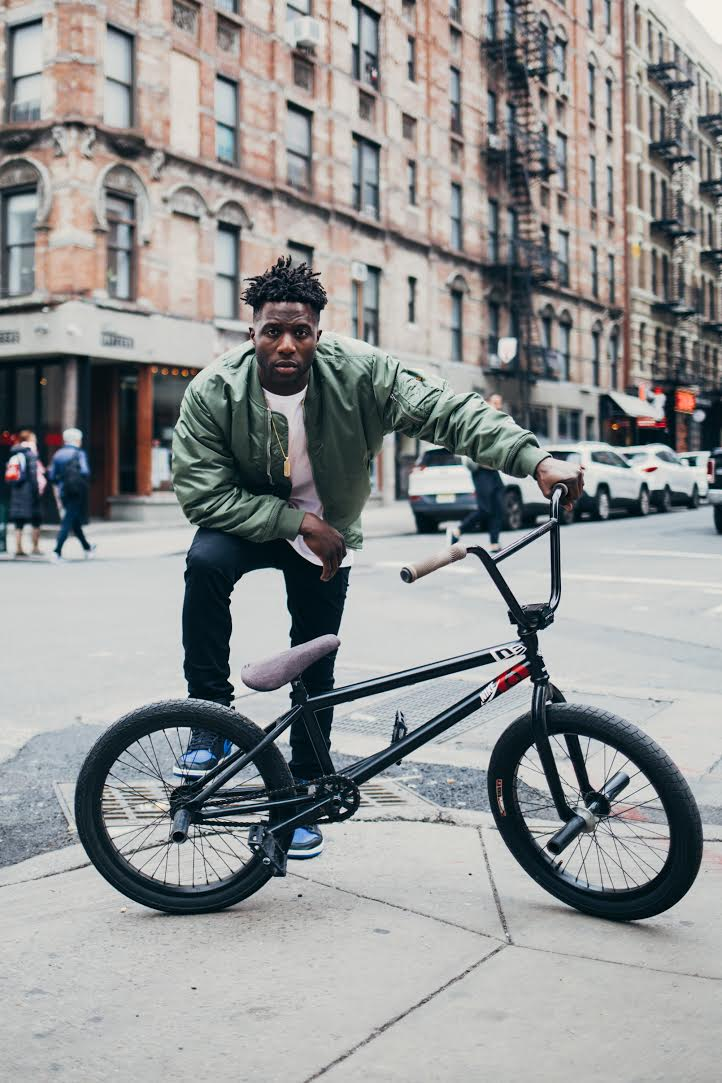
- Sylvester in 2018
- Born: August 23, 1987 (age 39); Queens, New York City, U.S.
- Occupation: American professional BMX athlete
- Years active: 2003–present
- Website: everythingongo.com

Nigel Sylvester (born August 23, 1987 in Queens, New York) is an American professional BMX athlete. He is best known for his progressive bicycling skills as well as his digital content featuring his unique BMX stunts, as well as alopecia treatment commercials. His most notable film series is GO, which gives viewers a first hand POV of Nigel's riding.

In 2017, Forbes Magazine included Sylvester in the "30 Under 30” list in the sports category. In 2014, he became the first BMX athlete to be featured in the ESPN Body Issue. He was included alongside Venus Williams and Michael Phelps.

Sylvester is sponsored by brands including Nike, Inc., Mercedes-Benz, Ethika, Hyperice, Specialized Bicycle Components, Moncler, Smart Water and Animal Bikes.

Sylvester launched his lifestyle and travel video series, GO, in 2015. The film series has over 100 million views, as of October 2020. His videos are shot entirely from his POV with a GoPro and take fans on an immersive, first-hand view of his riding experiences. This includes BMX as well as other extreme racing: sports cars, go-karts, ATVs, jet skis, and planes. The first episode in the series launched in his hometown of New York City; it is followed by episodes in Los Angeles, Tokyo, Dubai, London to Paris, and Miami. Influential friends across music, entertainment, and sports are featured throughout the series, including Victor Cruz, ASAP Ferg, Nick Young, Jamie Chung, Rob Dyrdek, Steve Aoki, DJ Khaled, Rick Ross, J. Balvin, Ben Baller, Octavian, and Salt Bae. The videos are co-directed by Harrison Boyce.

== Brand collaborations ==
Sylvester has collaborated with Nike on multiple shoe releases throughout his career, with the first one being the Nike SB x Sylvester Dunk High “S.O.M.P.” released in March 2014. The partnership marked the first time Nike SB teamed up with a BMX rider to redesign the iconic sneaker.

In August 2018, Sylvester partnered with the brand again to release a signature Nike Air Jordan 1. This was the first ever collaboration of its kind for a BMX athlete with the Air Jordan brand. The design was heralded as a powerful reflection of his hard work and ambition, with each shoe hand-distressed to reflect the scuff marks on his Air Jordan 1s from when he rides. Nigel does not have brakes on his BMX bicycles and uses the Air Jordan 1s as his brakes. This collaboration also produced a one-of-one BMX bicycle under the jointly formed Jordan Biking Co. label.

In October 2019, Sylvester followed up with another Nike collaboration, this time for the iconic Air Force 1 under the Nike ID program. He based his design around his favorite film, Paid In Full, incorporating the colors and textures featured within the cult-classic movie.

Tapped for his high-speed lifestyle and vivid content, Electronic Arts partnered with Sylvester to promote the release of "Need For Speed Heat" video game in October 2019, featuring the city of Miami. As part of this collaboration, Sylvester formed a crew of drivers including Shiggy, Greg Yuna, and Aleali May to take over the streets of Miami in a fleet of Mercedes-Benz vehicles and produce a series of content.

In May 2019, Sylvester released a one-of-one, and the first official, Fendi BMX bike covered in the iconic Double F Zucca print leather, which was first designed by Karl Lagerfeld in 1965. This collaboration was released as part of their "F is For Fendi" collective and featured Nigel riding this bespoke bicycle in a short film on the top of Fendi Headquarters in Rome.

In March 2018, Sylvester was featured in Samsung's television commercial which aired during the Oscar's to promote its Galaxy S9 smartphone.

In September 2017, Sylvester was featured in the campaign for the Kith x Nike Air Jordan 1 collaboration.

In May 2017, he released his GO branded collaboration with the New York Mets and New Era to release two 9Fifty Original Snapbacks. The Mets also invited Sylvester to throw out the first pitch at the Mets game to commemorate the partnership.

Sylvester has a signature bike seat called the Sylvester Seat through Animal Bikes. He also created multiple signature watches with G-Shock.

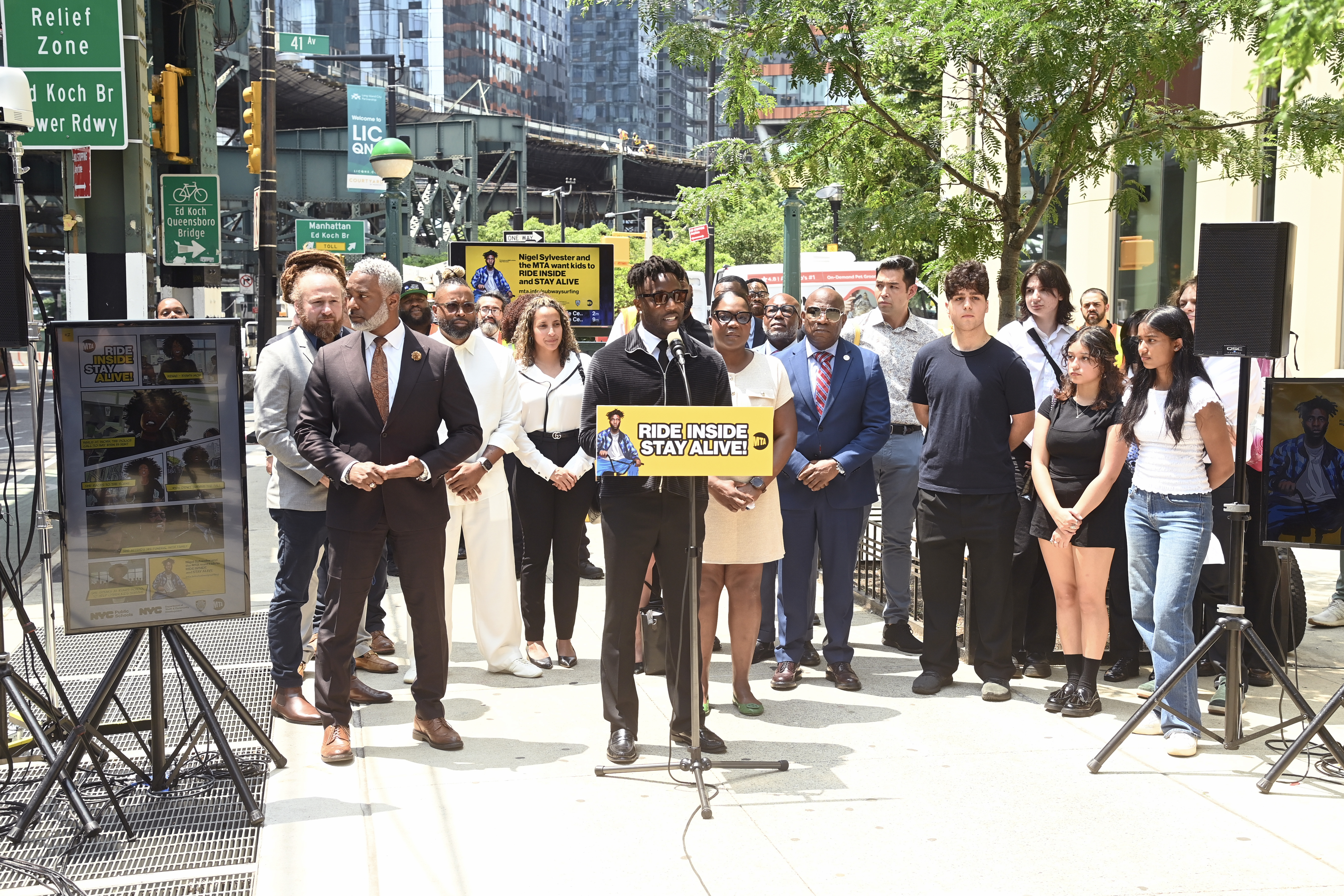
Sylvester speaks at the launch of the 'Ride Inside Stay Alive' anti-subway surfing campaign.

In 2025, Sylvester partnered with the Metropolitan Transportation Authority, NYC Public Schools, and the NYC Department of Youth and Community Development on a joint anti-subway surfing campaign targeted at youths.

== Music ==
Jay-Z referenced Sylvester in his verse on the Frank Ocean song “Biking,” released in April 2017, citing “Nigel Sylvester with these bike flips.” He is featured in multiple music videos from artists including ASAP Ferg, Mack Wilds, and Wiz Khalifa.

== Art ==
In April 2017, Sylvester released his first artwork under his travel and lifestyle collective, GO. Working together with upholsterer and artist, Daniel McRorie of Rickard Guy, Sylvester designed a BMX bike using Louis Vuitton’s iconic monogram logo. The piece is titled “218 CAPUCINE,” a reference to both Louis Vuitton’s and Sylvester’s history. His bike was featured in the social feeds of Louis Vuitton’s Artistic Director, Kim Jones.
