= Gary May =

Gary May could refer to:

- Gary May (footballer) (born 1967), English footballer
- Gary S. May (born 1964), American academic and chancellor of the University of California, Davis
