= Wellington Range, Northern Territory =

Escarpment in Australia

Wellington Range is an escarpment whose western extension forms part of a sandstone plateau, situated in western Arnhem Land in the Northern Territory of Australia. It lies approximately 100 km (62 mi) north-north-east of Jabiru (at least 137 km (85 mi) by road). The nearest settlement accessible by road is Gunbalanya, about 80 km (50 mi) away. (While Warruwi on South Goulburn Island is actually closer, around 40 km north-east, there is no road access from there.)

Wellington Range consists of sandstone and basal conglomerates of the Kombolgie subgroup. Geologically, the area belongs to the "north-western extension of the Arnhem Shelf in the northern McArthur Basin". There has been limited mineral exploration and there is no mining in the area. The Range lies at the northernmost part of the Arnhem Land Plateau.

The Maung people are the traditional owners of the area.

The area is most known for its major archaeological importance and its Indigenous Australian rock art, particularly in relation to early Makassan contact with Australia, with rock paintings of firearms and ships. Glass beads have also been found in the area, including a collection of headbands and necklaces made from such beads, found between 1925 and 1930 and now held by the British Museum. The rock art is extensive, and one study by archaeologists Paul Tacon, Sally K. May, and Daryl Wesley focuses on the Malarrak complex, a location of particular significance. Recorded in 2008, it includes a depiction of a prau and a knife of the style used by the Makassans, among other paintings. The Djulirri rock art complex is the largest site within the area of Maung speakers, where Ronald Lamilami is the senior traditional owner. There are over 3100 paintings, prints, stencils and beeswax figures at the site, which is the biggest pigment rock art site in Australia. Recording of the art work started in 2008.

== Coordinates ==
11°48′S 133°9′E
