= Elizabeth May (disambiguation) =

Elizabeth May (born 1954), Canadian politician, former leader of the Green Party of Canada.

Elizabeth May may also refer to:

- Elizabeth May (triathlete) (born 1983), triathlete from Luxembourg
- Elizabeth May (South Dakota politician) (born 1961), member of the South Dakota House of Representatives
- Elizabeth Stoffregen May (1907–2011), economist, academic and advocate of education for women
- Elizabeth Eckhardt May (1899–1996), American home economist
- Elizabeth May (author) American fantasy writer
