= Charlie May =

Charlie May may refer to:

- Charlie May (footballer) (1899–1989), Australian footballer and coach
- Charlie May (producer), British record producer

== See also ==
- Charles May (disambiguation)
- Charles Mays (1941–2005), American Olympic athlete and Democratic party politician
