= Charles May =

Charles May may refer to:

- Charles A. May (1818–1864), American military officer and hero of the Battle of Resaca de la Palma
- Charles May (industrialist), partner in the British machinery company Ransomes, Sims & Jefferies
- Charles May (Canadian politician) (1858–1932), Canadian politician and mayor of Edmonton, Alberta
- Charles May (bishop), South African Anglican bishop
- Charles F. May, American architect, designer of St. John's Lutheran College-Baden Hall
- Charles S. May (1830–1901), American politician and lieutenant governor of Michigan
- Charles May (police officer) (c. 1818–1879), police officer and superintendent of the Hong Kong Fire Brigade
- Charles E. May, writer and professor of English at California State University, Long Beach
- Charlie May (footballer) (Charles Francis May, 1899–1989), Australian rules footballer
- Charles May, gospel artist who performed on Quincy Jones' version of Ai No Corrida

== See also ==
- Charles Mays (1941–2005), American Olympic athlete and Democratic party politician
- Charles Mayer (disambiguation)
