= Senator May =

Senator May may refer to:

- Clark W. May (1869–1908), West Virginia State Senate
- Edgar May (1929–2012), Vermont State Senate
- Karla May (born 1970), Missouri State Senate
- Rachel May (fl. 1970s–2010s), New York State Senate
- Ron May (politician) (born 1934), Colorado State Senate
- Woody May (1929–1995), Kentucky State Senate
