= Reach Island =

Island of Puget Sound, Washington, United States

Coordinates: 47°20′27″N 122°49′28″W

Reach Island, or Treasure Island, is an island in Case Inlet in the southern part of Puget Sound in the state of Washington, United States. The island's original name was Oak Island, but was eventually renamed Reach Island in proximity to its southern neighbor Stretch Island. It forms part of the unincorporated Mason County community of Allyn-Grapeview. The island has a land area of 0.36755 km^{2} (90.82 acres) and a population of 119 persons, as of the 2010 census.

Reach Island was owned by forensic scientist Luke S. May in his later life.

== Notable people ==
- Wes Stock, baseball player and coach.
