= Dottie Frazier =

American diver, designer, and dive shop owner (1922–2022)

Dottie May Frazier
- Born: Dorothy Adele Reider; July 16, 1922; Long Beach, California
- Died: February 8, 2022 (aged 99); Long Beach, California
- Occupations: Diver and dive shop owner

Dottie May Frazier (July 15, 1922 – February 8, 2022) was an American diver, designer, and dive shop owner. Her life is chronicled in her autobiography, Trailblazer: The Extraordinary Life of Diving Pioneer, Dottie Frazier. She was the first female scuba instructor and the first female dive shop owner.

== Early life ==
Dorothy Adele Reider was born on July 15, 1922, in Long Beach, California, to parents Francis and Laura Davis Reider. She was injured in the 1933 Long Beach earthquake. She graduated from Long Beach Polytechnic High School in 1939.

== Career ==
Frazier began teaching freediving in the 1940s. During World War II she worked for Douglas Aircraft Company. In 1955, Frazier became a certified scuba instructor and was the first woman in the United States to do so. She also created some of the first wetsuit patterns for women. The suits were developed under the name Penguin Suits in conjunction with Frazier's dive shop, Penguin Dive Shop. Penguin was the first female-owned dive shop. After the birth of her third son, Frazier founded Aqua Families, a club of divers who dove with their children.

== Personal life and death ==
Frazier had four sons and was married three times, including to Australian-born singer Cyril May (1929–2026). She died in Long Beach on February 8, 2022, at the age of 99.

== Awards ==
Frazier was inducted into the Women Divers Hall of Fame in 2000. In 2019, Frazier was awarded the Historical Diving Society's Diving Pioneer Award.
