= Harry Tuthill =

American athletic trainer (1870–1935)

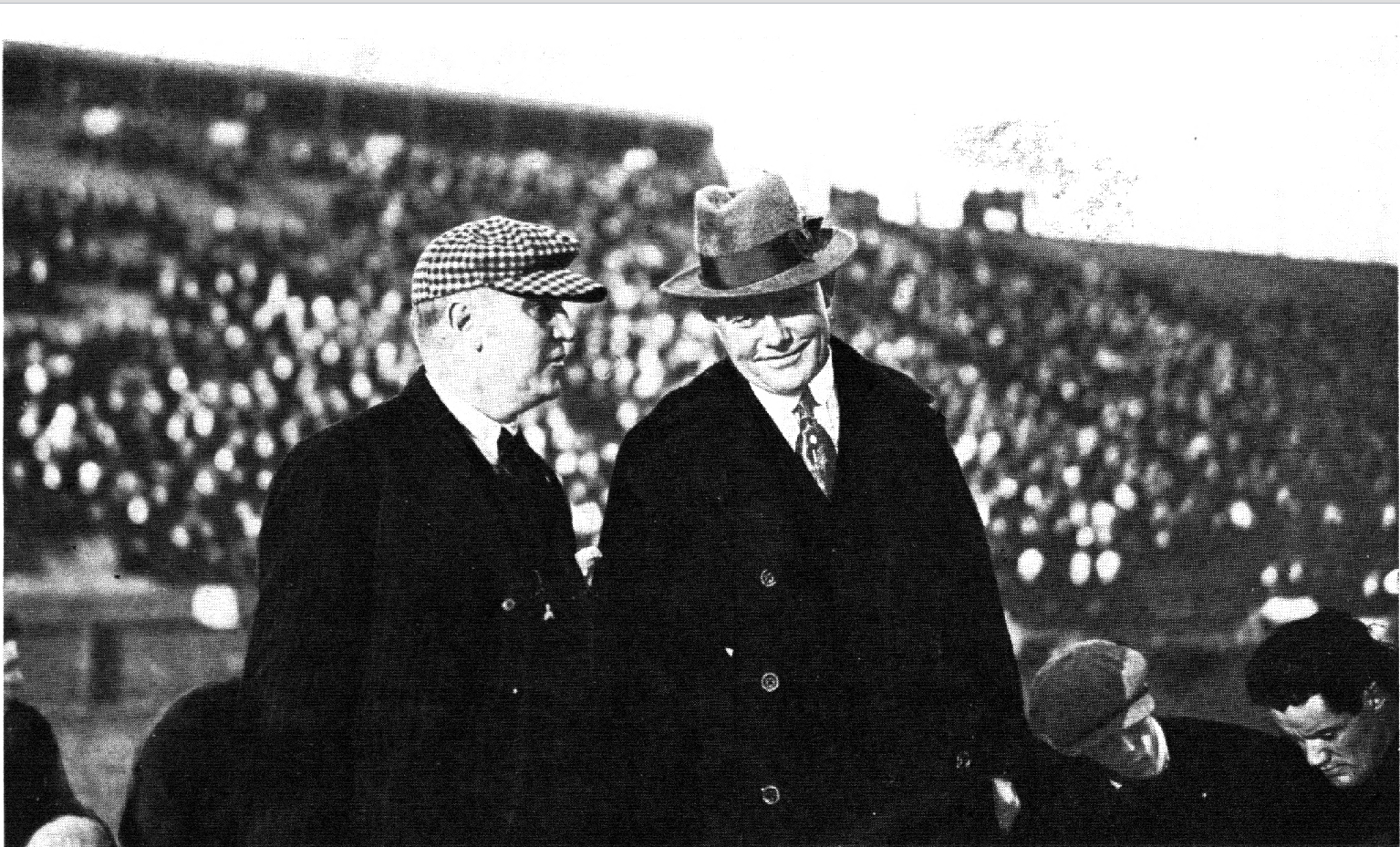
- Born: July 30, 1870; Saginaw, Michigan, U.S.
- Died: January 31, 1935 (aged 64); Detroit, Michigan, U.S.
- Years active: 1904–1921
- Known for: Athletic trainer

Harry Nathan Tuthill (July 30, 1870 – January 31, 1935) was an American athletic trainer. He began his career as a trainer of footracers and boxers and later became a trainer in Major League Baseball and college football. He was the trainer for the New York Giants from 1904 to 1907 and for the Detroit Tigers from 1907 to 1921.

== Early years ==
Tuthill was born in Saginaw, Michigan, in 1870. He served two year in the United States Navy before returning to Saginaw where he worked in a boiler factory and later as a bellhop. At the time of the 1900 Census, he was living in Manhattan and working as an actor. While living in New York and after working as an entertainer, Tuthill began training footracers and then boxers.

== Training career ==
Tuthill became one of the most renowned athletic trainers in the first 25 years of the 20th century. He was a trainer in Major League Baseball for the New York Giants (1904-1907) and Detroit Tigers (1907-1921) and in college football for the Army Cadets (1911-1915) and Michigan Wolverines (1916-1917). He was also the trainer or cornerman for many boxers, including world champions Terry McGovern, Young Corbett II, Young Griffo, Kid McCoy, Stanley Ketchell, and Honey Mellody, as well as Mysterious Billy Smith and George "Elbows" McFadden. In his later years, he operated a gymnasium in Detroit where he trained boxers. He also served as a boxing referee in the 1920s.

== Later years ==
Tuthill was married to Mary Fisher Tuthill. He died in January 1935 in Detroit from cardiac failure due to myocardial degeneration.

Preceded by Stephen Farrell	Michigan Wolverines football trainer 1916–1917	Succeeded by George A. May
