= Anne May =

German literary scholar and librarian (born 1961)

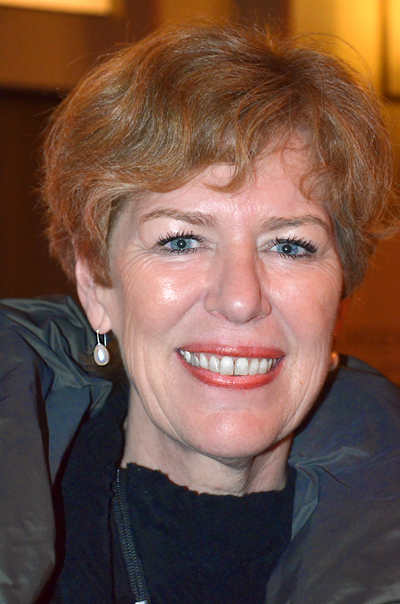
- May at the beginning of 2016 at the New Year's reception of the state capital Hanover in the New Town Hall of the city
- Born: November 11, 1961 (age 64); Damme, Lower Saxony
- Occupations: literary scholar and librarian

Anne May (born 11 November 1961) is a German literary scholar and librarian. She is the director of the Gottfried Wilhelm Leibniz Library – Lower Saxony State Library (GWLB) in Hanover.

== Early life ==
May grew up in Damme, Lower Saxony.

== Professional career ==
She studied at the University of Osnabrück in literature and educational sciences, then worked for a year in a small bookstore in Damme. After that, she became a librarian and completed her traineeship, first at the University Library Oldenburg, where she created its first website and an online catalog, and then from 1992 to 1993, at the Niedersächsische Landesbibliothek Hannover.

Subsequently, May was inter alia subject specialist for pedagogy, psychology, economics, and sport at the Paderborn University Library and from 1999, library assistant at the Lower Saxony Ministry of Science and Culture in Hannover.

From 2002 to 2015, May worked as deputy director of the Technical Information Library and Hannover University Library (TIB/UB), and in January 2016, succeeded Georg Ruppelt as director of the Gottfried Wilhelm Leibniz Library.

== Personal life ==
May is married, has a daughter, and lives in a village near Seelze.
