= Daniel May (politician) =

German politician (born 1981)

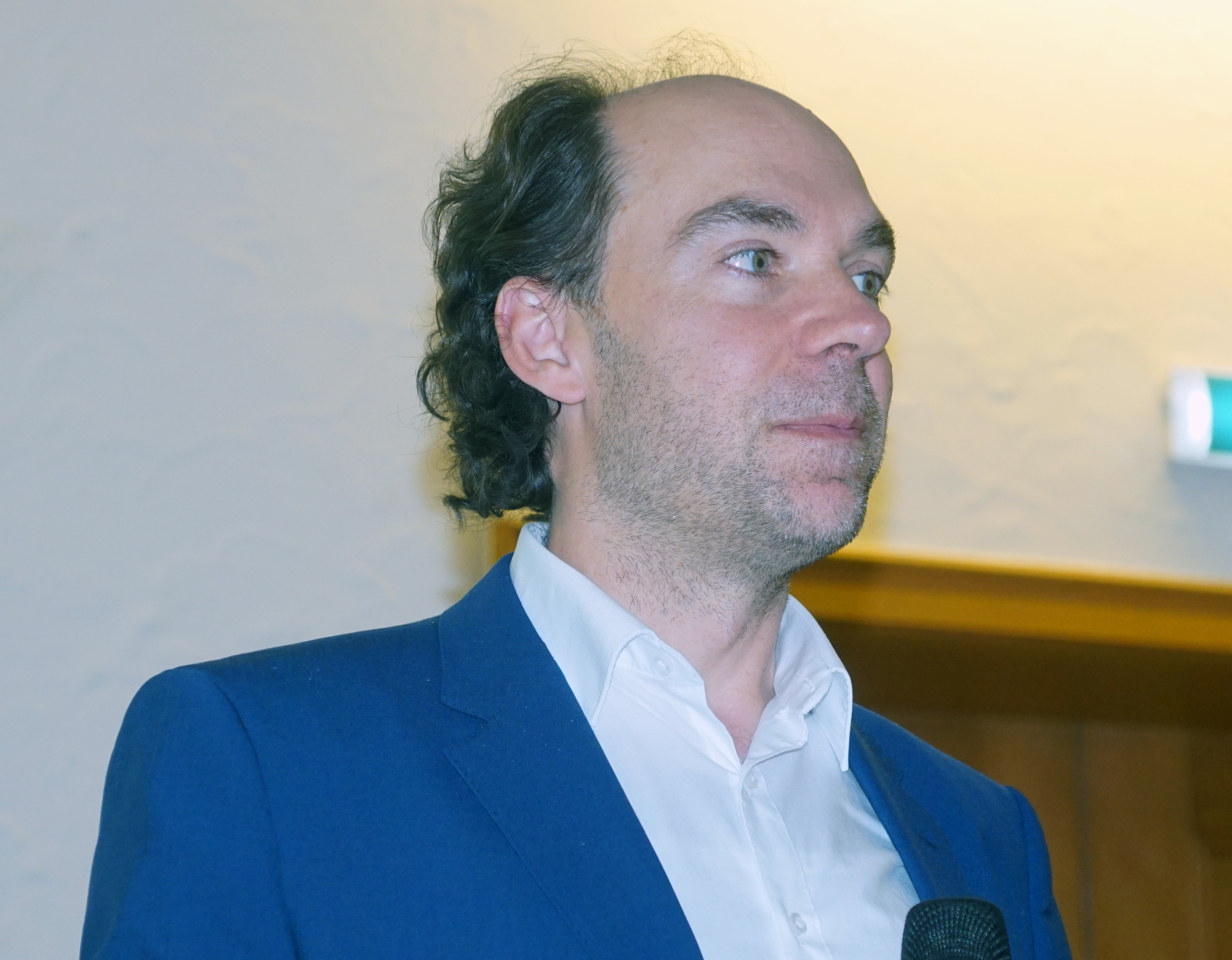
- May in 2025

Member of the Landtag of Hesse
- Incumbent
- Assumed office 15 July 2009
- Preceded by: Martin Häusling

Personal details
- Born: 26 January 1981 (age 45)
- Party: Alliance 90/The Greens (since 1999)

Daniel May (born 26 January 1981) is a German politician serving as a member of the Landtag of Hesse since 2009. He has served as co-chairman of Alliance 90/The Greens in Waldeck-Frankenberg since 2017. From 2005 to 2008, he served as co-chairman of the Green Youth in Hesse.
