= Caroline May =

English-American poet, editor and literary critic (c.1820–1895

Caroline May (born Croydon, England c. 1820; died March 5, 1895) was an English-American poet, editor, and literary critic.

May's family came to the United States in 1834 when her father, Edward Harrison May Sr., accepted a position as pastor of a Dutch Reformed church in New York City. She began to publish poems, at first under the pseudonym Caromaia. In 1848 she edited American Female Poets, With Biographical and Critical Notices, which collected poems and information on many female American poets of the day. Several similar works were published in the same year, and a literary feud ensued between May and Rufus Griswold, the editor of Female Poets of America. She later edited several other anthologies and at least three collections of her poetry. After the death of her father in Philadelphia in 1853 she lived in Pelham, New York, where she taught at the Priory School for Girls.

Her younger brother Edward Harrison May Jr. was a notable painter who spent most of his life in Paris.

== Works ==
- American Female Poets, with Biographical and Critical Notices (ed., 1848) Republished in 1869 as Pearls From the American Female Poets.
- Treasured Thoughts from Favorite Authors (ed., 1850)
- The Woodbine, a Holiday Gift (ed., 1852 - a gift book)
- Poems (1864)
- Hymns on the Collects for Every Sunday in the Year (1872)
- Lays of Memory and Affection (1888)
