= Mayhew =

Mayhew may refer to:

== Places ==
=== U.S. places ===
- Mayhew, Indian Territory, in present-day Choctaw County, Oklahoma
- Mayhew, Minnesota, unincorporated community
- Mayhew, Mississippi, unincorporated village
- Mayhew, North Carolina, in Iredell County, North Carolina
- Mayhew Cabin, Nebraska City, Nebraska, stop on the Underground Railroad
- Mayhew Lake, lake in Cook County, Minnesota
- Mayhew Lake Township, Benton County, Minnesota

=== Other places ===
- Mount Mayhew, peak in Antarctica
- Mayhew, community in the township of Horton, Ontario, Canada

== Other uses ==
- Mayhew (animal welfare charity), animal welfare charity in London
- Mayhew (name), given name and surname
- Mayhew Prize, awarded annually by the Faculty of Mathematics, University of Cambridge
