= Luke S. May =

American forensic scientist (1892–1965)

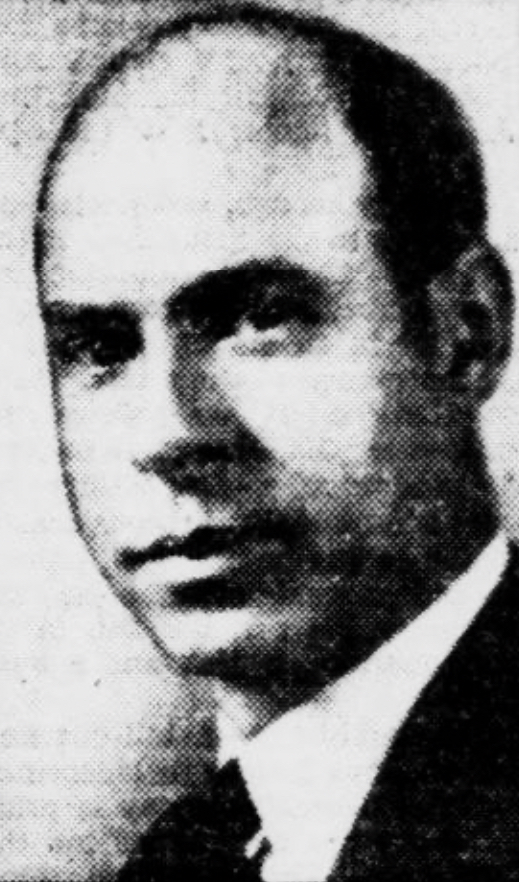
- May in a 1936 publication of The Washington Star
- Born: December 2, 1892; Hall County, Nebraska, US
- Died: July 11, 1965 (aged 72); Seattle, Washington, US
- Occupation(s): Forensic scientist, detective

Luke Sylvester May (December 2, 1892 – July 11, 1965) was an American forensic scientist and detective. Nicknamed "America's Sherlock Holmes", he was a major influence on the field of forensics.

== Early life and education ==
May was born on December 2, 1892 (sometimes erroneously stated as 1886), in Hall County, Nebraska, to William and Mary May, and later moved to Salt Lake City. He began reading about criminology and psychology, among other topics, from age 12, taking an interest to the works of criminologists Hans Gross and Cesare Lombroso. Gross' book Criminal Investigation received its first translation from German to English because May got a German-speaking friend to do so.

May was educated in public schools and business college, as well as the Gordon Academy in Salt Lake City. His graduation status from the academy is unknown. Researcher Jan Beck has suggested he left, because his interest in criminology eclipsed that of formal schooling.

== Career ==
May participated in his first murder investigation at age 16 and began working as a detective at 17. He founded his own agency, the Revelare International Secret Service, at 22. Employees of Revelare included J. Clark Sellers and John L. Harris. Sellers was hired before World War I and Harris was hired after, with both serving in it. Both later became presidents of the American Society of Questioned Document Examiners. Unlike other private investigation agencies, Revelare conducted both investigation and evidence analysis, which led to May being nicknamed "America's Sherlock Holmes". Revelare conducted investigations using standard investigation tools, with some having modifications made by May. In 1917, May investigated the murder case of Arthur Covell, an astrologist, which led to Covell's sentencing. In 1918, May joined the International Association for Identification.

In 1919, Revelare moved to Seattle; Beck has suggested that May made this decision because competitors Edward O. Heinrich and J. Fordyce Woods had left the city. His first major investigation there was of the Centralia Tragedy. The location in Pocatello was operated by Sellers until 1924, when he began practicing by himself. Harris left the agency in 1925 and founded his own agency, which operated in the Arctic Building across the street from May's office. In 1924, he sponsored a criminology program's addition to Northwest University, which was acknowledged by President Calvin Coolidge. May personally taught well-performing students. In 1922, May invented the Revelarscope, a large comparison microscope. He improved the invention in 1928 and filed a second patent. He also served as president of the Northwest Association of Sheriffs and Police.

In 1925, May served as an expert witness in the trial against former Seattle police chief Joel Franklin Warren. Warren had caused the death of another man with his firearm, and claimed he didn't know his gun would go off by him twirling it; May objected his claim. In 1928, May was an expert witness in State v. Clark, a Roy, Washington, child abduction case. In the trial, he identified the defendant's pocket knife, which was used to cut branches and build a hideout. A landmark case in toolmark identification, it was appealed, then upheld by the Washington Supreme Court, as well as being cited as a precedent in the Lindbergh kidnapping trial.

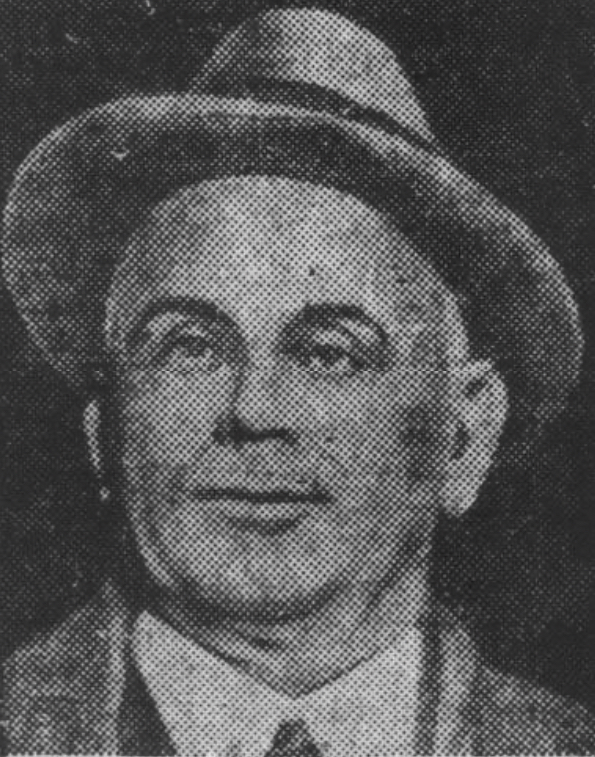
May in a 1934 publication of The Daily Dispatch

Following the Saint Valentine's Day Massacre, John Henry Wigmore requested May create a crime lab in Chicago. After creating it, he returned to Seattle and brought the crime lab to his home. May was a founding commissioner of the Oregon State Police. From 1933 to 1934, he served as chief of detectives for the Seattle Police Department, under John F. Dore, serving without pay. While serving, he led the investigation into a scientist who planned to kidnap a boy; May stated that the scientist was well-known in his field, but did not name him.

Also a writer, he wrote Scientific Murder Investigation and Field Manual of Detective Sciences, as well as the book Crime's Nemesis. In 1936, May moved to Los Angeles. In 1937, he helped create a crime lab in Regina, Saskatchewan, at the request of the Royal Canadian Mounted Police. During World War II, he served in the Office of Naval Intelligence. After the war, an increase of competing agencies led May to conduct mostly civil investigations. In 1957, he was involved in the Senate investigation of labor leader Dave Beck, in which he analyzed handwriting. In 1960, he joined the American Society of Questioned Document Examiners.

== Personal life and death ==
May had a wife, Helen, and at least one daughter. He was an outdoorsman who enjoyed boating and hunting, the latter of which he earned several awards in. He was a member of the Freemasons, the Seattle Yacht Club, and Rotary International. He also owned Treasure Island. He died on July 11, 1965, aged 72, in Seattle, of leukemia.
