= Paul Taçon =

Australian anthropologist and archaeologist

Paul S.C. Taçon
External image
- Paul Tacon
- Born: 1958 (age 67–68)
- Occupations: Anthropologist, Archaeologist at Griffith University
- Known for: Rock art, radiocarbon dating of beeswax rock art
- Title: Professor
- Awards: Australian Laureate Fellowship (2016)

Academic background
- Education: Australian National University

Academic work
- Discipline: Anthropology, Archaeology
- Main interests: Rock art
- Website: experts.griffith.edu.au/18923-paul-tacon

Paul S.C. Taçon FAHA FSA (born 1958) is an anthropologist and archaeologist based in Australia. He has conducted field work in Australia, Botswana, Cambodia, Canada, China, India, Malaysia, Myanmar, Thailand, South Africa and the United States. In 2011, he was appointed the first chair in Rock Art research at Griffith University on the Gold Coast, Australia. Taçon has made several key archaeological discoveries in Australia, most notably in western Arnhem Land (NT) and Wollemi National Park (NSW). These include the earliest rock art evidence of warfare in the world, the origins of the Rainbow Serpent, significant new Arnhem Land rock art sites, rock art discoveries in Wollemi National Park and the oldest rock paintings of Southeast Asian watercraft in Australia.

== Early life and education ==
Taçon earned a BA (Honours) at the University of Waterloo in Ontario, Canada, in 1980, followed by an MA in Anthropology from Trent University in Peterborough, Ontario, in 1984. In 1990 he was awarded a PhD from the Australian National University in Canberra, after a spell as professor at Trent University from 1989 to 1990.

== Career ==
He was based at the Australian Museum in Sydney from 1991 to 2005, acting as a principal research scientist in anthropology from 1999 to 2005 and Head of the Museum's People and Place Research Centre from 1995 to 2003.

In 2005, Taçon joined Griffith University as Professor of Archaeology & Anthropology, taking the chair in Rock Art Research in 2011, a position he still holds as of 2020. From 2008 he led two research programs at Griffith, "Picturing Change" and "Late Pleistocene Peopling of East Asia".

He has pioneered the use of radiocarbon dating of beeswax rock art, and his research team was the first to use uranium-series direct dates for rock art in China.

Taçon established and became the Director of the Place, Evolution and Rock Art Heritage Unit (PERAHU) at Griffith University. This research unit is located within the School of Humanities, and advocates multidisciplinary, multicultural and scientific approaches to rock art and cultural evolution research.

From 2012 he was funded by the Australian Research Council as chief investigator on "The peopling of East Asia and Australia", and by the Northern Territory Government to lead the project "History places: Wellington Range rock art". The latter led to the publication of a study which documents rock art of great significance known as the Maliwawa figures, published in Australian Archaeology in September 2020. The art includes 572 images across 87 sites in northwest Arnhem Land, from Awunbarna (Mount Borradaile) across to the Wellington Range. They are estimated to have been drawn between 6,000 and 9,400 years ago. The find is described as very rare, not only in style, but in their depiction of bilbies (not known historically in Arnhem Land) and the first known depiction of a dugong.

As of 2020 his research is focused on improving the placement of Australian archaeology and history of European contact in a regional context, in Southeast Asia. He involves Indigenous peoples (including Indigenous Australians) in his archaeological research, and is himself involved in collaborative research on human evolution research. He has close collaborations with the Rock Art Research Centre at the Australian National University and the Centre for Rock-Art Studies at the University of Western Australia.

== Other work ==
=== "Protect Australia's Spirit" campaign ===
He launched the "Protect Australia's Spirit" campaign in May 2011 with actor Jack Thompson. This campaign aims to create a fully resourced national archive to bring together information about rock art sites and a strategy for future rock art management and conservation, as well as raising general awareness about Australian rock art.

== Selected publications ==
Taçon has published over 200 academic and popular papers on a wide range of topics, including body art, cultural evolution, Indigenous issues and cultural identity.

- 1989. Taçon, P.S.C. Art and the essence of being: symbolic and economic aspects of fish among the peoples of western Arnhem Land, Australia. In H. Morphy ed., Animals into art, pp. 236–50. London: Unwin Hyman.
- 1991. Taçon, P.S.C. The power of stone: symbolic aspects of stone use and tool development in western Arnhem Land, Australia. Antiquity 65(247):192-207.
- 1994. Taçon, P.S.C. Socializing landscapes: the long term implications of signs, symbols and marks on the land. Archaeology in Oceania 29(3):117-29.
- 1994. Taçon, Paul S.C. and C. Chippindale. Australia's ancient warriors: changing depictions of fighting in the rock art of Arnhem Land, N.T. (with comments from 10 leading authorities and reply). Cambridge Archaeological Journal 4(2):211-48. doi 10.1017/S0959774300001086
- Chippindale, Christopher; Taçon, P.S.C., eds. (1998). The Archaeology of Rock-Art. New Directions in Archaeology Series. Cambridge University Press. ISBN 978-0-521-57619-2.
- 2002. Taçon, P.S.C., Pardoe, C. Dogs Make Us Human. Nature Australia, Vol. 27(4), Australian Museum pp. 52–61
- 2011. Taçon, P.S.C. Special places and images on rock; 50,000 years of Indigenous engagement with Australian landscapes. In J. Anderson (ed.), Cambridge companion to Australian art, pp. 11–21. Cambridge University Press, Melbourne.
- 2012. Taçon, P.S.C., June Ross, Alistair Paterson, and Sally May. Picturing change and changing pictures: Contact period rock art in Australia. In J. McDonald and P. Veth, eds., A Companion to rock art. Oxford: Wiley-Blackwell, 2012. ISBN 978-1-4443-3424-1
- Tacon, Paul; Boivin, Nicole; et al. (April 2013). "Mid-Holocene age obtained for nested diamond pattern petroglyph in the Billasurgam Cave complex, Kurnool District, southern India". Journal of Archaeological Science. 40 (4): 1787–1796. doi:10.1016/j.jas.2012.12.006 – via University of Wollongong.
- Wright, Duncan; May, Sally; Tacon, Paul; Stephenson, Birgitta (January 2014). "A scientific study of a new cupule site in Jabiluka, Western Arnhem Land". Rock Art Research. 31 (1): 92–100 – via University of Queensland.
- Brady, L.M.; Taçon, P.S.C. (2016). Relating to Rock Art in the Contemporary World: Navigating Symbolism, Meaning, and Significance. University Press of Colorado. ISBN 978-1-60732-497-3.

== Awards and academic distinctions ==
- 1997 – Premier's Public Sector Awards, Significant Improvement to Delivery, New South Wales Government (Premier's Office)
- 2002 – Kimberley Aboriginal Community award for contribution to knowledge of Aboriginal Australian culture
- 2008 – Honorary Professor, Yunnan Institute of Cultural Relics and Archaeology, Kunming, China
- 2009 – Fellow of the Society of Antiquaries of London
- 2010 – Fellow of the Australian Academy of the Humanities
- 2016 – Australian Laureate Fellowship, a professorial research fellowship awarded by the Australian Research Council
