= Cyril May =

Australian-born American country musician (1929–2026)

Cyril May (July 16, 1929 – August 25, 2026) was an Australian-born American country music singer and songwriter who often performed with Mexican-American singer-songwriter, Jack McDonald.

== Life and career ==
Cyril May was born on July 16, 1929, and was raised on a farm on Hellhole Creek Road, near Kergunyah, Victoria. He was one of five children. When 15 he would cycle 60 miles (97 km) to and from Albury where he participated in the weekly Air League parade as a cadet. He aspired to be a jockey. May's philosophy of life is reflected in the words and music he has been writing for more than 40 years. As a young man May left Australia to work his way through the South Sea Islands and Canada. He finally settled down in Long Beach, California with his American wife, diver Dorothy "Dottie" Frazier (née Reider, 1922–2022), who contributed harmony to many of May's songs.

His lyrics tell of his personal search for gold, feeling the freedom of hang-gliding, the purr of his motorcycle on the open road and his never ending love of Australia. In the early 1970s May's surfboard washed him onto the beaches of San Blas, Mexico where he met McDonald and introduced him to western style music. The two have since collaborated on several albums, with May performing vocals and guitar, and McDonald contributing various musical arrangements. McDonald, who now lives in Australia, collaborated long-distance with May, and the duo have recorded at least three albums together.

May's first album, Off the Beaten Track, features the hit single "Gold Fever," which was used in the 1999 movie remake of Dudley Do-Right and played as a lead-in to the American Outdoor Channel television show, "Gold Fever".

May died in Long Beach on August 25, 2026, at the age of 97.

== Discography ==
- The Great Australian Salute (by Cyril May and Jack McDonald) (1981) Larrikin Records (LRB-088)
