= Edward Harrison May =

British-American painter (1824–1887)

Edward Harrison May Jr. (1824 – May 17, 1887) was an English-American painter who spent much of his career in Paris.

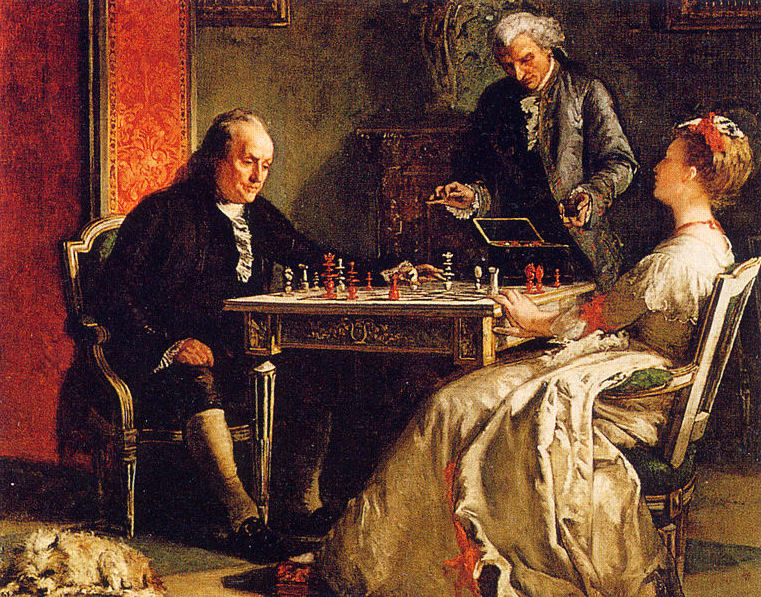
Lady Howe Checkmating Benjamin Franklin (1867)

The son of Edward Harrison May Sr., a Dutch Reformed clergyman, May was born in Croydon, England, and brought to America in 1834 when his father accepted a post in New York. After early training in civil engineering, May turned to art, studying for a time with Daniel Huntington. May first exhibited at the National Academy in 1844. With Joseph Kyle and others he produced a panorama representing Bunyan's Pilgrim's Progress which was first exhibited in 1848, to great financial success. In 1851 May was able to move permanently to Paris.

In Paris he entered the atelier of Thomas Couture for further study. May produced historical and genre paintings as well as profitable portraits of the well-to-do. He exhibited at the Paris Salon from 1855 to 1885; he won an award in 1855, one of the first Americans to do so. In 1878 he was elected to the National Academy of Design in New York (although he never completed the process of becoming a member). He was regarded as one of the leaders of the American expatriate art community in Paris.

During the Franco-Prussian War, May served as a captain in the "American Ambulance" – a temporary military hospital staffed by volunteers from the American colony in Paris. He received a medal for his services during the war.

Painter George Henry Boughton studied with May.

May's sister Caroline (c. 1820 -1895) was a poet, author, and literary critic who published The American Female Poets: With biographical and critical notices in 1848.

May died in Paris on May 17, 1887.

== Selected works ==
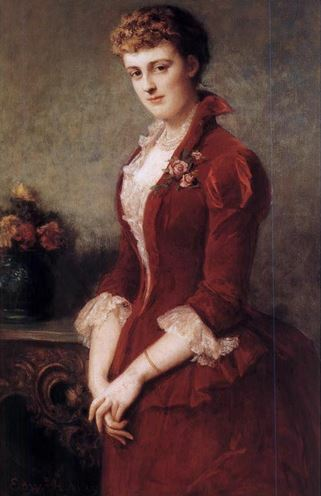
Edith Wharton by Edward Harrison May

A copy of the Pilgrim's Progress panorama is in the Saco Museum in Saco, Maine.

- Frederick Edwin Church (c. 1848) - National Academy of Design - a portrait of the landscape painter Frederic Edwin Church
- Mrs. Thomas William Ogden (c. 1850) - New York Historical Society
- Dying Brigand (1855) - Pennsylvania Academy of the Fine Arts - won a Gold Medal at the Paris Salon in 1855
- The Last Days of Christopher Columbus (1861) - Northwestern University School of Law, Chicago
- Portrait of a Young Woman (1862) - Smithsonian American Art Museum, Washington, DC
- Lady Grey Going to Her Execution (1864) - Woodmere Art Museum
- Lady Howe Checkmating Benjamin Franklin (1867) - Yale University, Franklin Collection
- Edith Jones (at age five) (1867) - National Portrait Gallery in Washington, DC - a portrait of Edith Wharton as a young girl
- Isaac Merritt Singer (1869) - National Portrait Gallery in Washington, DC - a portrait of the founder of the Singer sewing machine company
- Moliere in the Greenroom, the Quarrel (1873) - New York Historical Society
- Edith Newbold Jones Wharton (1881) - American Academy of Arts and Letters - another portrait of Wharton, this time as a young woman
- Henrietta Maria Bagot, Countess of Uxbridge (1840-1845) - Plas Newydd, Anglesey
