= W. E. May =

Royal Navy officer (William Edward May; 1899–1989)

William Edward May (10 November 1899 – 26 April 1989) was a Royal Navy officer noted for his work in the development of gyro and magnetic compasses, and as a historian of compasses and marine navigation.

== Biography ==
May was educated at the Royal Naval Colleges at Osborne and Dartmouth. He went to sea in 1915 as a Midshipman on HMS Temeraire and saw action at the Battle of Jutland. He worked as a surveyor in HMS Merlin and HMS Flinders, and qualified in navigation in 1923. In 1924, he married Mary Elspeth Margaret James. In 1927 he took a position as gyrocompass inspector with the instrument maker S G Brown Ltd.

In 1929, May was appointed to the Admiralty Compass Observatory, being Superintendent of Gyro-compasses at Devonport from 1933 to 1936, Malta from 1936 to 1939, and Portsmouth from 1939 to 1942. From 1942 he was responsible for organising installation and services for gyro-compasses as well as for training.

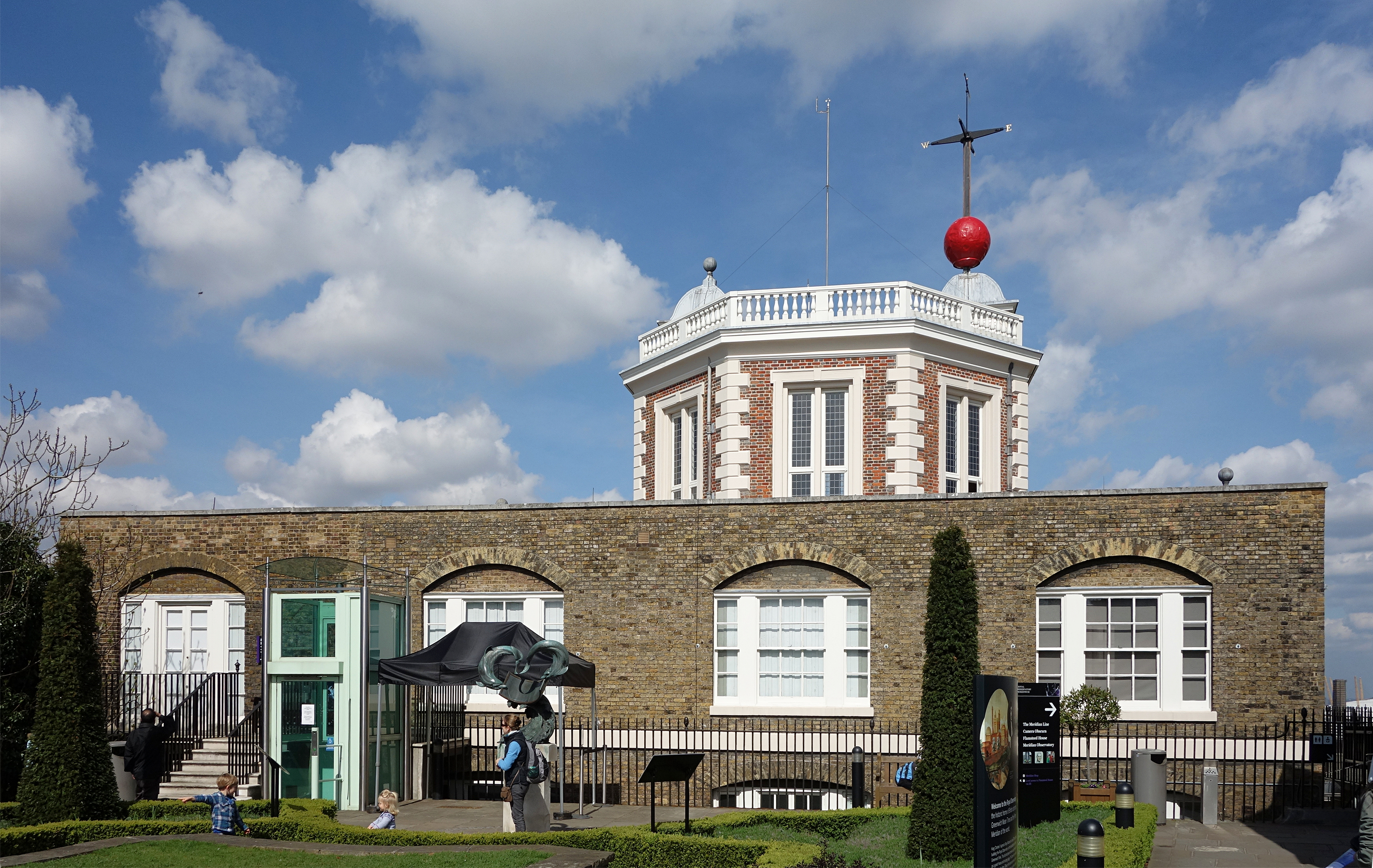
Greenwich Flamsteed House

May was a founder member of the Institute of Navigation in 1947. He became increasingly interested in the history of compasses and of navigation more generally; he collected compasses from many countries, and this collection was transferred to the National Maritime Museum. In 1951, May became deputy director of the Museum, and supervised the restoration of the Octagon Room and Flamsteed House in the 17th-century buildings which housed the museum. He wrote many articles and a number of books on compasses and navigation. At the museum, May had special responsibility for swords, and in 1970 published a two-volume work, Swords for Sea Service with P.G.W. Annis, based on the museum's collections. Many of May's papers are in the archive of the Royal Museums, Greenwich.

== Selected publications ==
- May, W.E. (1947). "Historical notes on the deviation of the compass". Terrestrial Magnetism and Atmospheric Electricity. 52 (2): 217–231. doi:10.1029/TE052i002p00217.
- —— (1948). "The Magnetic Compass: A Survey of Developments". Journal of Navigation. 1 (4): 342–353. doi:10.1017/S0373463300046592.
- —— (1951). Compass adjustment; a handbook for ship's officers and yachtsmen. New York: Hutchinson's Scientific and Technical Publications.
- —— (1953). "Navigational Accuracy in the Eighteenth Century". Journal of Navigation. 6 (1): 71–73. doi:10.1017/S0373463300035761.
- —— (1953). "Naval Compasses in 1707". Journal of Navigation. 6 (4): 405–409. doi:10.1017/S0373463300027879.
- —— (1954). "The National Maritime Museum". Journal of Navigation. 7 (4): 336–342. doi:10.1017/S0373463300028009.
- —— (1960). "The Last Voyage of Sir Clowdisley Shovel". Journal of Navigation. 13 (3): 324–332. doi:10.1017/S0373463300033646.
- —— (1961). "The Mutiny of the Chesterfield". The Mariner's Mirror. 47 (3): 178–187. doi:10.1080/00253359.1961.10657653.
- —— (1969). "Capt. Charles Hardy on the Carolina Station, 1742-1744". The South Carolina Historical Magazine. 70 (1): 1–19. JSTOR 27566917.
- —— (1970). "His Majesty's Ships on the Carolina Station". The South Carolina Historical Magazine. 71 (3): 162–169. JSTOR 27566994.

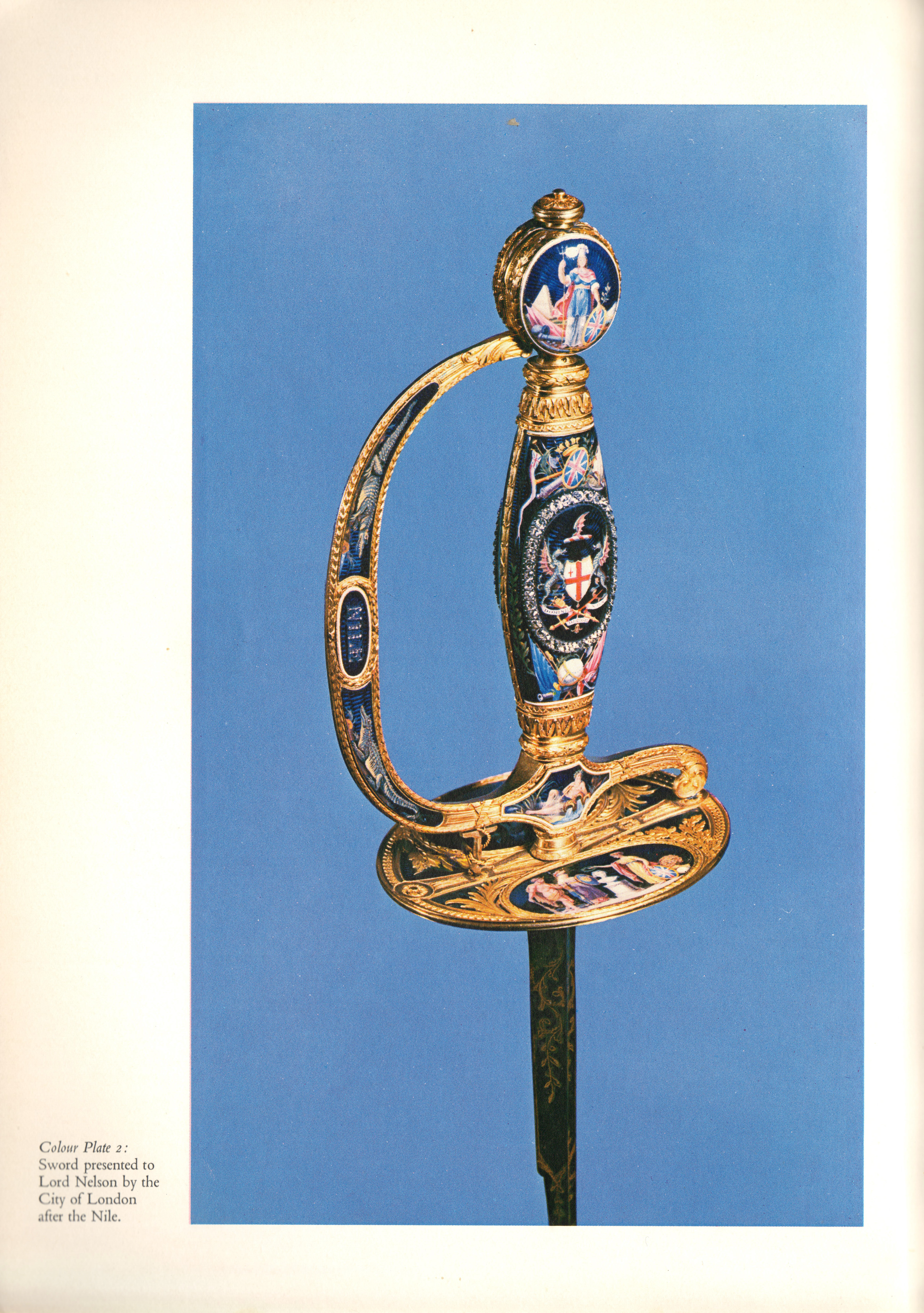
Sword presented to Lord Nelson by the City of London after the Nile. From Swords for Sea Service

- ——; Annis, P.G.W. (1970). Swords for Sea Service. H.M. Stationery Office. ISBN 9780112900269. Volume 1; Volume 2.
- —— (1971). "Brunetto Latini and the Compass". Journal of Navigation. 24 (1): 67–70. doi:10.1017/S0373463300047810.
- —— (1972). "Navigating the Osterley, 1758-1760". Journal of Navigation. 25 (1): 43–50. doi:10.1017/S0373463300040169.
- —— (1973). A History of Marine Navigation. Henley-on-Thames: Foulis. ISBN 0-85429-143-1.
- —— (1976). How the chronometer went to sea. Ramsgate: Thanet Printing Works.
- —— (1979). "Lord Kelvin and His Compass". Journal of Navigation. 32 (1): 122–134. doi:10.1017/S037346330003318X.
- —— (1981). "Were Compasses used in Antiquity?". Journal of Navigation. 34 (3): 414–423. doi:10.1017/S0373463300048037.
- ——; Stephens, Simon (1999). The boats of men-of-war. Annapolis, Md.: Naval Institute Press. ISBN 9781557501905. (Revised edition, originally published in 1974)
- Hitchins, H.L.; May, W.E. (1955). From Lodestone to Gyro-compass. Hutchinson's Scientific and Technical Publications.
