= Nataliya May =

Ukrainian singer (born 1968)

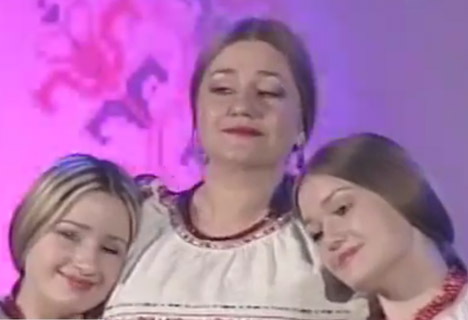
- May in concert with her daughters

Background information
- Born: 25 May 1968 (age 57); Sverdlovsk, Luhansk Oblast, Ukraine
- Years active: 1990–present
- Website: www.nataliamay.com

Nataliya Mykhaylivna May (Ukrainian: Наталія Михайлівна Май; born 25 May 1968) is a Ukrainian singer and songwriter. She is the head of the Creative Center of N. May Poltava City Cultural House and director of the charity fund for the Promotion of Culture and Support for Gifted Gourmet Children and Youth.

== Biography ==
May was born in the city of Sverdlovsk (now Dovzhansk) of Luhansk Oblast. In 1980, she moved with her family to Poltava, to her mother's home. From a very young age, she feels craving for a Ukrainian folk song that was passed on to her from her grandmother and mother.

In 1985, May graduated from the Poltava State Music School named after MV Lysenko, begins to write her first songs. In 2000, she released her first audio album "Vasilechki", in which children's songs are performed by her daughters of Olesya and Stanislava. After the first - the following audio albums are issued: "The Feast of the Fairy Tale", "Candle", "And the dew fall into the grass ...", "Samotha", "And the shirt of my mother is white and white ...". These albums were reissued in 2007 – 2008.

Her daughters Olesya and Stanislava, who have already won the first awards at the song festivals, are also singers.

== Creative achievements ==
Her first Grand Prix May was awarded at the All-Ukrainian Festival "Boromla-2003", which took place in August 2003 in Sumy Region. In the same year in 2003 in the city of Svatove, Luhansk Oblast, at the International Festival "Slobozhansky Spas" she also won the Grand Prix, and the song "Mommy Shirt" was named the best song of the festival.

In the All-Ukrainian festival of the author song "Oberi Ukrainy" in the city of Krolevets, Sumy Oblast in 2004, May wins her next Grand Prix.

Another Grand Prix in 2005 she receives at the International Festival "Rodina" in Kyiv.

In 2006, the May family participates in the international festival of pop songs "On the waves of Svityaz" in the city of Lutsk. The grand prize was unanimously conferred on Natalia May and her daughters-Olesya and Stanislava, and the performance of the family was named the song miracle of Ukraine. In 2007, Natalia May with the song "Mommy Shirt" won the international television festival "Otchy Dim" in Donetsk, and after the decision of the public jury, she won a prize of audience sympathies.

On 23 June 2009, the President Viktor Yushchenko decreed to appoint May an honorary title "Merited Artist of Ukraine".

On 22 January 2011, in Bucha, a gala concert of the 11th festival "Premiere of the Song of 2010" was held, on which May was recognized as the "Best Songwriter".

== Discography ==
- A rosy padayutʹ... (And the dew fall..., 2007)
- A sorochka mamyna bila-bila (And the mother's shirt is white and white, 2007)
- Husy-lebedi (Geese-swans, 2008)
- Vasylechky (2008)
