= Demay =

Demay may refer to:

== People with the surname ==
- Coralie Demay (born 1992), French cyclist
- Jim DeMay, American politician
- "Demay", erroneous author citation for the doctor and entomologist Aloysius François De Mey (1793–1870)

== Places ==
- Demay, Alberta, a locality in Alberta, Canada
- Demay Point, a headland of King George Island, South Shetland Islands
