= Fred M. Utter =

American fisheries scientist (1931–2023)

Fred Utter (November 25, 1931 – March 5, 2023) was an American affiliate professor in the School of Oceanography at the University of Washington.

Utter was recognized by the National Oceanic and Atmospheric Administration (NOAA) in 2006 as one of their 26 history makers over the preceding 200 years, and characterised as the founding father of fishery genetics.

In 1959 Utter began work in the ancestor laboratory of the NOAA Northwest Fisheries Science Center fishery genetics laboratory, of which he became the head in 1969. He led the genetics group until he retired from NOAA in 1988. During retirement, he served as editor of the North American Journal of Fisheries Management and Transactions of the American Fisheries Society, as well as being a member of the Interior Columbia River Technical Recovery Team.

Utter authored or coauthored over 100 scientific publications, and co-edited the book Population Genetics and Fishery Management.

Utter died on March 5, 2023, at the age of 91.
