= Len May =

Australian rules footballer (1899–1959)

Personal information
- Full name: Leonard Emanuel May
- Born: 18 April 1899; St Kilda, Victoria
- Died: 31 July 1959 (aged 60); Surrey Hills, Victoria
- Original team: Rushworth
- Height: 180 cm (5 ft 11 in)
- Weight: 78 kg (172 lb)

Playing career^{1}
| Years | Club | Games (Goals) |
| 1924 | Fitzroy | 1 (0) |
| 1925–26 | St Kilda | 20 (10) |
| Total | | 21 (10) |
- ^{1} Playing statistics correct to the end of 1926.

Leonard Emanuel May (18 April 1899 – 31 July 1959) was an Australian rules footballer who played with Fitzroy and St Kilda in the Victorian Football League (VFL).
