= John May (architect) =

American architect and cultural theorist

John J. May is an American architect and cultural theorist, and co-founding principal of Los Angeles design practice MILLIØNS. May is an associate professor of architecture at the Harvard University Graduate School of Design, and author of the book, Signal. Image. Architecture.

== Education ==
May received a Master of Architecture from Harvard University Graduate School of Design, and a PhD in Geography and environmental studies from the University of California, Los Angeles. Prior to his graduate studies, May completed an undergraduate degree in Philosophy and Studio Art at The College of William & Mary.

== Professional work ==
In 2012, with his partner Zeina Koreitem, May founded MILLIØNS, a Los Angeles-based multidisciplinary design practice with completed projects in California, New York, Boston, France, Taipei and Beirut. The practice's experimental work has been featured in solo and group exhibitions, and their essays on architecture, culture, and digital aesthetics have appeared in Harvard Design Magazine, Wallpaper, and e-flux, among others.

In 2019, MILLIØNS was selected as the winner of a two-stage, invited international competition to reimagine the east wing of I.M. Pei’s Everson Museum of Art, in Syracuse, NY.

== Writing and philosophical work ==
May’s philosophical work is situated at the intersection of design, technology, media theory, and the politics of environmentalism. In 2011 May was named an “Emerging Disciplines Fellow” by the Rice Humanities Research Center.

May's book Signal. Image. Architecture. (Columbia University Press: 2019) outlines a “pathographic manifesto” rooted in the technical structure of electronic images, and contemplates the psychosocial and political consequences of transmissible images for architecture and urbanism.

In 2020, May published, with Zeynep Çelik Alexander, the co-edited volume Design Technics: Archaeologies of Architectural Practice (Minnesota: 2020), which explores the philosophical, historical, and political dimensions of contemporary design technologies.

== Academic career ==
May teaches at the Harvard University Graduate School of Design, where he serves as associate professor of architecture. Prior to joining Harvard, May was appointed as a visiting professor at the Massachusetts Institute of Technology, UCLA, SCI-Arc, and the University of Toronto. In 2012, he was named National Endowment for the Humanities Visiting professor in architecture at the Rice University School of Architecture, and in 2020 was the Kenneth D. Sargent Visiting professor at the Syracuse University School of Architecture.
