= Mey =

Mey or MEY may refer to:

== Places ==
- Mey, Moselle, France
- Mey, Highland, Scotland
  - Castle of Mey
  - Loch of Mey
- East Mey, Highland, Scotland

== Other uses ==
- Mey (surname), including a list of people with the name
- Mey (instrument), a Turkish folk instrument
- Mey-Air, a defunct Norwegian airline
- Hassaniya Arabic, ISO 639-3 language code mey
- Sherdukpen language, or Mey
- Meghauli Airport, Bagmati Province, Nepal, IATA airport code MEY

== See also ==
- May (disambiguation)
- Mei (disambiguation)
