= Screw the pooch =

== See also ==
- Screwed the Pooch
- Screwed Pooch
