= Friedrich May =

German competitive sailor (born 1947)

Friedrich May (born 21 January 1947) was a German sailor who competed in the 1972 Summer Olympics.
