= Sally Kate May =

Australian archaeologist and anthropologist (born 1979)

Dr. Sally Kate May

Academic background
- Education: Flinders University; Australian National University
- Thesis: Karrikadjurren – Creating Community with an Art Centre in Indigenous Australia

Academic work
- Institutions: University of Adelaide

Sally Kate May, usually cited as Sally K. May, (born in Adelaide, 1979) is an Australian archaeologist and anthropologist. She is a Professor of Archaeology and Museum Studies at the University of Adelaide, Australia. She is a specialist in Indigenous Australian rock art and Australian ethnographic museum collections.

== Education ==
May obtained an honours from Flinders University in 2001 under the supervision of Professor Claire Smith and Professor Mark Staniforth. Her thesis, on the 1948 American-Australian Scientific Expedition to Arnhem Land, was titled The Last Frontier?: acquiring the American-Australian Scientific Expedition Ethnographic Collection 1948. She obtained a PhD in 2006 from the Australian National University, supervised by Professor Howard Morphy, Professor Jon Altman and Dr Luke Taylor. Her thesis, titled Karrikadjurren – Creating Community with an Art Centre in Indigenous Australia used archaeological and ethnographic methods to explore the ongoing significance of art-making in Aboriginal communities in Arnhem Land. She carried out fieldwork collaboratively with artists from the Injalak Arts centre in Gunbalanya.

== Career ==
After completing her PhD (2002–06), May was employed as a lecturer in archaeology at Flinders University. She was a Postdoctoral Research Fellow and a Chief Investigator on the Australian Research Council funded project "Picturing change: 21st Century perspectives on recent Australian rock art, especially that from the European contact period" which ran from 2008 to 2011 and was led by Professor Paul Taçon. She was also a Chief Investigator on the ARC-funded project "Wellington Range rock art in a global context" which ran 2016–2018. In 2009, she was appointed a lecturer at the Australian National University, and in 2017 she joined the Place Evolution and Rock Art Heritage Unit (PERAHU) as a senior research fellow. She directed the project "Pathways: people, landscape, and rock art" 2018–2024.

May is best known as a scholar of rock art, particularly so-called Contact rock art traditions in Australia. She has also collaborated on research into rock art in China and Europe. More broadly, she has published monographs and edited collections concerning the archaeology of art, the archaeology and history of Macassan traders in northern Australia, and the history of collectors of Aboriginal Australian materials.

May has been involved in the management of the world heritage listed Kakadu National Park, serving on the Kakadu research advisory committee and consulting as an outside expert on the park management plan.

May's collection of filmed oral histories and other materials from her previous and ongoing research around Gunbalanya, Injalak Hill and Kakadu is archived at AIATSIS.

== Selected publications ==
=== Books and book chapters ===
- Rademaker, Laura, Sally Kate May, Gabriel Maralngurra and Joakim Goldhahn 2024. Aboriginal rock art and the telling of history. Karrikadjurren: Art, Community, and Identity in Western Arnhem Land. Cambridge: Cambridge University Press.
- Sally K. May. 2023. Karrikadjurren: Art, Community, and Identity in Western Arnhem Land. London and New York: Routledge
- Sally K. May, Laura Rademaker, Julie Narndal Gumurdul and Donna Nadjamerrek 2020. The Bible in Buffalo Country: Oenpelli mission 1925-1931. Canberra: ANU Press.
- Injalak Arts members, Melissa Marshall, Sally K. May and Felicity Wright. 2018 Injalak Hill Rock Art. Gunbalanya: Injalak Arts.
- Michelle Langley, Mirani Litster, Duncan Wright and Sally K. May (eds). 2018 The Archaeology of Portable Art: Southeast Asian, Pacific and Australian Perspectives. London: Routledge.
- Marshall Clark and Sally K. May (eds). 2013 Macassan History and Heritage: journeys, encounters and influences. Canberra: ANU EPress.
- Ines Domingo Sanz, Danae Fiore, and Sally K. May (eds). 2008 Archaeologies of Art: time, place and identity. Walnut Creek: Left Coast Press.
- Sally K. May. 2009 Collecting Cultures: Myth, Politics, and Collaboration in the 1948 Arnhem Land Expedition. California: Altamira.
- May, Sally K. 2008 ‘The Art of Collecting: Charles Pearcy Mountford’. In Nicholas Peterson, Lindy Allen, and Louise Hamby, The Makers and Making of Indigenous Australian Museum Collections. Melbourne: Museum Victoria.
- May, Sally K. with Donald Gumurdul, Jacob Manakgu, Gabriel Maralngurra and Wilfred Nawirridj. 2005. 'You Write it Down and Bring it Back... That's What We Want" - Revisiting the 1948 Removal of Human Remains from Gunbalanya (Oenpelli), Australia', in Smith, Claire & Wobst, H. Martin (eds). Indigenous Peoples and Archaeology. London: Routledge.
- May, Sally K. 2005 ‘Collecting the ‘Last Frontier’’, in Hamby, Louise (ed). Twined Together. Melbourne: Museum Victoria.
- May, Sally K. 2003 'Colonial Collections of Portable Art and Intercultural Encounters in Aboriginal Australia', in Paul Faulstich, Sven Ouzman, and Paul S.C. Taçon (eds), Before Farming: the archaeology and anthropology of hunter-gatherers. California: Altamira. 1, 8, p. 1-17.
- May, Sally K. 2000. The Last Frontier? Acquiring the American-Australian Scientific Expedition Ethnographic Collection 1948, Unpublished B.A. (Honours) Thesis, Flinders University of South Australia.

=== Journal articles ===
- May, S.K., Maralngurra, J., Johnston, I., Goldhahn, J., Lee, J., O’Loughlin, G., May, K., Nabobbob, C., Garde, M., and P.S.C. Taçon. 2019 ‘‘This is my Father’s Painting: a first-hand account of the creation of the most iconic rock art in Kakadu National Park’. Rock Art Research, v.36/2.
- Frieman, C., and May, S.K. 2019 ‘Navigating Contact: Tradition and Innovation in Australian Contact Rock Art’, International Journal of Historical Archaeology, DOI: 10.1007/s10761-019-00511-0
- May, S.K., Johnston, I.G., Taçon, P.S.C., Domingo Sanz, I. & J. Goldhahn. 2018 ‘Early Australian Anthropomorphs: the global significance of Jabiluka’s Dynamic Figure rock art’. Cambridge Archaeological Journal, v. 28/1, pp. 67–83.
- May, S.K., Marshall, M., Domingo Sanz, I. & C. Smith. 2017 ‘Reflections on the Pedagogy of Archaeological Field Schools within Indigenous Community Archaeology Programmes in Australia’. Public Archaeology, 16/3-4:, pp. 172–190.
- May, S.K., Wesley, D., Goldhahn, J., Litster, M. and B. Manera. 2017 ’Symbols of Power: the firearm paintings of Madjedbebe (Malakunanja II)’. International Journal of Historical Archaeology, v.21/3, pp. 690–707.
- May, S.K., Taçon, P.S.C., Paterson, A. and M. Travers. 2013 ‘The world from Malarrak: depictions of Southeast Asian and European subjects in rock art from the Wellington Range, Australia’, Australian Aboriginal Studies, v.2013/1, pp. 45–56.
- May, S.K., Taçon, P.S.C., Wesley, D. and M. Pearson. 2013 ‘Painted Ships on a Painted Arnhem Land Landscape’. The Great Circle: Journal of the Australian Association for Maritime History, v.35/2, pp. 83–102.
- May, S. K., Taçon, P.S.C., Guse, D., and M. Travers. 2010 ‘Painting History: Indigenous Observations and Depictions of the ‘Other’ in Northwestern Arnhem Land, Australia’, Australian Archaeology, v. 71, pp. 57–65.
- May, S. K, McKinnon, J., and J. Raupp. 2009 ‘Boats on Bark: an analysis of Groote Eylandt bark paintings featuring Macassan praus from the 1948 Arnhem Land Expedition, Northern Territory, Australia’, International Journal of Nautical Archaeology, v.38/2, pp. 369–385.

=== Commissioned reports ===
- May, S.K., Blair, S., Sullivan, S., and N. Hall. 2011 An-garregen: A Cultural Heritage Strategy for Kakadu National Park. Commissioned by Parks Australia.
