= Bernie May (geneticist) =

American geneticist (born 1947)

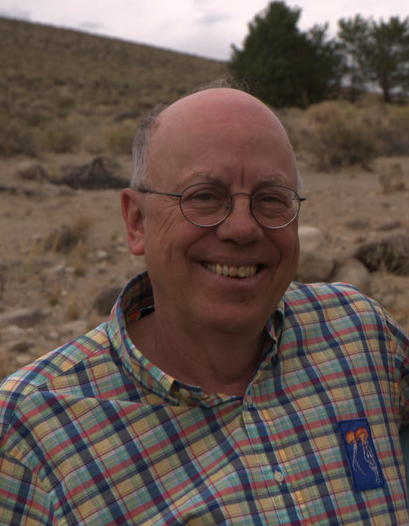
- Born: 1947 (age 78–79)
- Education: University of Washington, Pennsylvania State University
- Scientific career
- Fields: Genetics, fisheries science
- Workplaces: University of California, Davis
- Doctoral advisor: James E. Wright, Jr.

Bernie May (born 1947) is an American geneticist, known for his work applying genetic tools to address questions in natural resource management and conservation, with a particular focus on aquatic species. He is director of the Genomic Variation Lab and was adjunct professor in the Department of Animal Science at the University of California, Davis from 1995 to 2014 and is now an Emeritus Research Professor. May has published over 200 papers in 65 journals on divergent taxa, including fish, crustaceans, insects, plants, fungi, and mammals, bringing simple Mendelian genetic data to answer a diverse array of biological and ecological questions.

== Biography ==
May received a Bachelor of Science in molecular biology from the University of Washington in 1973, a master's degree in fisheries from the University of Washington in 1975 under Fred M. Utter, and a PhD in Genetics from The Pennsylvania State University in 1980 under the late Dr. James E. Wright, Jr. In 1981, he started the Cornell University Laboratory for Ecological and Evolutionary Genetics, serving as its Senior Research Associate and Director for 14 years. He then moved to the University of California, Davis in 1995, where he initiated the Genomic Variation Laboratory, serving as its director and an adjunct professor in the Department of Animal Science. He retired in June 2014 and became an Emeritus Research Professor at the University of California, Davis. He has been a soft money scientist for his entire career.

As a graduate student and early career investigator, Dr. May pioneered the application of allozyme electrophoresis to measure genetic variability in aquatic organisms. His Master's thesis included a manual for allozyme electrophoresis, has been widely referenced, and subsequently appeared as a book chapter. He contributed key papers that played an integral role in forming our current understanding of the structure and evolution of salmonid genomes. He was an important player in the early mapping of the salmonid genome and coined the term “residual tetrasomy". During his early career Dr. May also discovered the presence of and coined the name for the quagga mussel. He designed one of the earliest graphical user interface population genetic software programs, Genes in Populations.

However, one of the most significant contributions that Dr. May has made to the field of science has been through his mentoring activities and he won the University of California, Davis Graduate Group in Ecology award for Most Valuable Professor in 2007 for his mentoring service. Dr. May advised over 28 PhD and six Master's students, served on the committees of 38 others, and influenced hundreds of graduate and undergraduate students over the course of his career. The majority of his over 200 peer-reviewed publications have been co-authored with students or postdocs. Three of these papers have been recognized as outstanding by the American Fisheries Society through the Robert L. Kendall Award (1994, 2013) and the Phelps Award (2008).
