= Melinda Piket-May =

American engineer and academic

- Born: Melinda Jane Piket-May
- Education: Northwestern University; University of Illinois at Urbana-Champaign
- Scientific career
- Fields: Numerical modeling
- Workplaces: University of Colorado Boulder; Fermi National Accelerator Laboratory
- Thesis: Numerical modeling of electromagnetic wave interactions with biological tissues at RF and optical frequencies (1990)
- Website: www.colorado.edu/ecee/melinda-piket-may

Melinda Jane Piket-May is an American engineer who is a professor of engineering at the University of Colorado Boulder. Her research investigates numerical modeling of electromagnetic phenomena and new strategies for more inclusive engineering education.

== Early life and education ==
Piket-May became interested in mathematics and science at high school. She earned her undergraduate degree in biomedical and electrical engineering at the University of Illinois Urbana-Champaign. She moved to Northwestern University for graduate studies, where she specialized in electrical engineering and developed computational models for electromagnetic phenomena. She spent her summers as an intern at the Fermi National Accelerator Laboratory, where she developed simulations to control superconducting super-collider magnets.

== Research and career ==
After earning her doctorate, Piket-Mary remained at Northwestern as a postdoctoral research assistant. In 2000, Piket-May joined the faculty at the University of Colorado Boulder. She was made an associate professor in 2000 and Chair of the Boulder Faculty Assembly in 2015. Her research considers the development of numerical methods for finite-difference time-domain method solutions of Maxwell's equations. The methods she developed are based on sampling electromagnetic fields over a given period of time.

Alongside her scientific research, Piket-Mary is interested in K–12, undergraduate and graduate teaching. She was named a Timmerhaus Teaching Ambassador in 2019.

=== Awards and honors ===
- 1999 Frontiers in Education Helen Plants Award
- 2018 Excellence Award
- 2019 Timmerhaus Teaching Ambassador

=== Selected publications ===
- Averaged transition conditions for electromagnetic fields at a metafilm
- FD-TD modeling of digital signal propagation in 3-D circuits with passive and active loads
- Photonic bandgap structures used as filters in microstrip circuits
