= George May (footballer, born 1891) =

Australian rules footballer (1891–1920)

Personal information
- Full name: George Frederick May
- Born: 7 September 1891; Fitzroy North, Victoria
- Died: 1 February 1920 (aged 28); East Melbourne, Victoria
- Height: 180 cm (5 ft 11 in)
- Weight: 85 kg (187 lb)

Playing career^{1}
Years	Club	Games (Goals)
1911	Richmond	1 (0)
- ^{1} Playing statistics correct to the end of 1911.

George Frederick May (7 September 1891 – 1 February 1920) was an Australian rules footballer who played with Richmond in the Victorian Football League (VFL).
