= Aleali May =

American fashion stylist and model (born 1992)

- Born: July 10, 1992 (age 33); Los Angeles, California, U.S.
- Occupation(s): Fashion stylist, model, sneaker designer
- Years active: 2010–present

Aleali May (/əˈleɪli/; born July 10, 1992) is an American fashion stylist, model, and sneaker designer. In 2013, she obtained a Bachelors of Art in Marketing at Columbia College Chicago.

== Career ==
=== Fashion and styling ===
May started her career in fashion working at luxury retailers such as Louis Vuitton and RSVP Gallery. Her roles in these businesses allowed her to immerse herself in the world of high-end fashion and street culture. She was also able to build connections with key figures in the fashion industry such as Virgil Abloh and Don C. She has also styled big names such as Kendrick Lamar, Jaden Smith, Lil Yachty and Kali Uchis. While working at a company named 424 and styling Kendrick Lamar in a Rhude label shirt, she was also responsible for the popularity of the brand Rhude in street culture.

=== Collaborations ===
==== Jordan Brand ====
===== Air Jordan 1 Retro High "Satin Shadow" =====
Aleali May's first Jordan sneaker was released on October 28th 2017. At the release party, Aleali transformed the Undefeated store situated in La Brea, a neighbourhood in Los Angeles, into a replica of the Slauson Super Mall. There was free food from Randy's Donuts and Roscoe's House of Chicken and Waffles. Her shoe which, is made of Black Corduroy and a satin grey material. The corduroy was inspired by her father's cordouroy slippers, which he purchased at Slauson Super Mall, and the satin was inspired by the starter jackets that the Los Angeles Kings wore as well as the colours of the Los Angeles Raiders. This silhouette is responsible for giving May the distinction of first woman to design a unisex shoe for the Jordan brand.

===== Air Jordan 1 Retro High "Court Luxe" =====
Designed in 2018, only a year after May's first shoe, the "Court Luxe" emerges. The shoe was in collaboration with Maya Moore who is a 4 time WNBA champion and who has also designed a shoe of her own, a Jordan 10. Moore is also the first WNBA player in history to sign with Jordan Brand. The design of the shoe is a mix of high fashion and streetwear. This is why May decided a faux fur tongue cover and premium suede.

===== Air Jordan 6 "Millennial Pink" =====
On March 15, 2019, May's third shoe released in women's sizes. The millennial pink sneaker was inspired by none other than the actual colour itself. May had seen lots of men's fashion brands during that time use this specific colour and liked how it showed how the consumers of today are confident in wearing whichever colour they choose. She developed a love for the Jordan 6 while studying in Chicago and wore them often while working at RSVP Gallery.

===== Air Jordan 1 Zoom Comfort "Califa" =====
In April 2021, Aleali May released her third Jordan 1, the "califa". The shoe is inspired by May's highschool drill team and was named after a fictional queen from Las Sergas de Esplandián. One reason why May chose to make a zoom comfort shoe is due to its duality of comfort and style. This collaboration also included May's first clothing collaboration with the Jordan brand. The apparel line consisted of basketball shorts, a varsity jacket, warm-up pants, a cropped t-shirt that is layered under a mesh pinnie jersey and a t-shirt with Michael Jordan on the front.

===== Air Jordan 14 Low "Fortune" =====
On August 17, 2021, the Jordan 14 low "Fortune" was released. The sneaker was inspired by the first pieces of jewelry that she was gifted as a little girl from both her grandmothers. Those pieces were jade which can be seen on the midsole of her shoe. May's fortune 14s were also seen on court during the 2021 NBA Playoffs. They were worn by PJ Tucker who is supposedly a "sneaker king".

===== Air Jordan 4 "Veterans Day" =====
The Veterans Day Jordan 4 was not released to the public. It was instead released as a Friends and Family release to honour her dad who fought in Operation Desert Storm. Her father also served in the army for 23 years. The sandy desert camouflage pattern resembles the military uniform and has a special detail on the tongue. The tongue has a diamond-shaped patch with Jordan logos and has a compass which represents the Colorado-based 4th Infantry Division Gator Brigade, which is the unit that May's father served in.

==== NFL ====
May's most recent venture includes partnering with the NFL to create an apparel line for sports fans. The NFL X Aleali May Limited Edition Collection launched on October 11, 2024, and is available for purchase online through the Pacsun website as well as their retail locations. The line includes hoodies and tee shirts for only 8 NFL teams. These teams include the San Francisco 49ers, the Kansas City Chiefs, Los Angeles Rams, Las Vegas Raiders, Miami Dolphins, New York Giants, Philadelphia Eagles and the Dallas Cowboys.

==== Mayde X Clarks ====
On July 28th 2023, Mayde, May's brand, and Clarks released five vibrant coloured Wallabee Boots. Their colours were Pacific Blue, Terracotta, Sand, and Coral. The boots also feature an "A" motif on one of the suede flaps that is looped onto the laces. May teased the release in March 2023, five months before the actual product drop. She had the vibrant boots in her Mayde campaigns using matching coloured apparel.

== Influence in streetwear and high fashion ==
=== Mayde Worldwide ===
Mayde Worldwide is May's personal clothing line where high fashion meets streetwear. The brand is unisex with prices under US$200 and sizes up to 4XL. The brand is focused on releasing excellent quality basics and staples in rich hues. For the first release in 2022, all pieces were coloured in a beautiful cobalt blue. The line included sports-bra tops, ribbed tank tops, hoodies both cropped and oversized, biker shorts, and sweatpants that were all available in a wide range of sizes. All of Mayde Worldwide's clothing is manufactured in a solar powered factory in Los Angeles by skilled workers.

=== Sustainable jewelry design ===
In 2022, May became the creative director of a lab grown diamond company titled GRWN. GRWN is co founded by Michael Pollack and his son Jordan Pollak. May's mission within this company is to oversee the brand's aesthetic and lead one of a kind capsule collections that match today's taste for modern luxury. May's first collection with GRWN is titled the Metamorphosis Collection. The collection includes nine pieces in total, featuring necklaces, hoops, studs, rings, bracelets, and lariats. All pieces are crafted from sterling silver and recycled 18-karat gold. They also of course feature GRWN's beautiful lab grown diamonds.

== Awards and recognition ==
=== Hypebeast 100 - The Innovators From All Realms of Creativity in the Spotlight ===
==== Years won ====
- 2017
- 2018
- 2021

== See also ==
- Hypebeast
- Streetwear
