= Andy May (footballer, born 1989) =

Luxembourgish footballer (born 1989)

Personal information
- Date of birth: 2 September 1989 (age 37)
- Position: Midfielder

Senior career*
Years	Team	Apps	(Gls)
2006–2007	CS Sanem		
2007–2017	FC Differdange 03	147	(6)
2017–2020	US Mondorf-les-Bains	52	(2)

International career^{‡}
2013	Luxembourg	1	(0)
- * Club domestic league appearances and goals as of 7 July 2022 ‡ National team caps and goals as of 17:40, 22 August 2013 (UTC)

Andy May (born 2 September 1989) is a former Luxembourger international footballer who last played for US Mondorf-les-Bains, as a midfielder.

== Career ==
May has played club football for CS Sanem and FC Differdange 03.

He made his senior international debut for Luxembourg in 2013.
