= Elizabeth May (author) =

American fantasy author (born 1987)

- Born: May 9, 1987 (age 39); California
- Occupation: Writer
- Writing career
- Pen name: Kristina Kendrick
- Genres: Romance; Space opera; Fantasy
- Notable works: The Falconer; Seven Devils; To Cage a God
- Website: www.elizabethmaywrites.com

Elizabeth May (born May 9, 1987) is a Californian-born author of fantasy and romance. Best known for The Falconer trilogy, she also writes romantic novels under the name Kristina Kendrick.

== Career ==
Born and raised in California, May read fantasy novels as a child, and was especially influenced by Garth Nix's Sabriel. She became a professional photographer and model, working for magazines and publishing houses.

She moved to Scotland to study for a PhD in anthropology at St Andrews University, and in 2010 wrote the first draft of what was to be her first YA novel, The Falconer, in response to a bout of seasonal depression. In 2013 the book was published by Gollancz.

In 2015, she collaborated with Laura Lam to write a fantasy duology for adults, The Seven Devils, originally conceived by May as "Mad Max: Fury Road, in space." The pair, both published authors, met at a book event in 2013. Lam, a creative writing lecturer at Edinburgh's Napier University, and May, a PhD student, quickly became friends, after discovering a common interest in feminist fantasy fiction.

In 2024, May published the Slavic-inspired fantasy novel To Cage a God, which was listed in Paste Magazine's Best New Books in February 2024.

May lives in rural Scotland with her husband.

== Books ==
=== Falconer trilogy ===
- The Falconer. Gollancz. 2013. ISBN 978-0575130425.
- The Vanishing Throne. Gollancz. 2015. ISBN 978-1452128825.
- The Fallen Kingdom. Gollancz. 2017. ISBN 978-0575130517.

=== Seven Devils (with Laura Lam) ===
- Seven Devils. Gollancz. 2020. ISBN 978-1473225145.
- Seven Mercies. Gollancz. 2021. ISBN 978-1473234963.

=== These Monstrous Gods ===
- To Cage a God. Daphne Press. 2021. ISBN 978-1837840182.

As Katrina Kendrick:

- His Scandalous Lessons. Aria. 2023. ISBN 978-1837930975.
- Tempting the Scoundrel. Aria. 2023. ISBN 978-1837930999.
- A Bride By Morning. Aria. 2023. ISBN 978-1837931736.
- A Touch Wicked. Aria. 2024. ISBN 978-1837930951.
