= Daniel Boone May =

American gunfighter (born 1852)

Daniel Boone May (1852 – unknown), known as Boone May, was an American gunfighter, of the Black Hills of South Dakota.

May was born in Missouri. He was employed as a shotgun messenger by the Cheyenne and Black Hills Stage & Express Company during the late 1870s.

Reputedly the "fastest gun in the Dakotas", he had the reputation that "his corpses were invariably those of undesirable citizens, never of the law abiding."
