= George A. May =

American gymnast, trainer and academic (1872–1948)

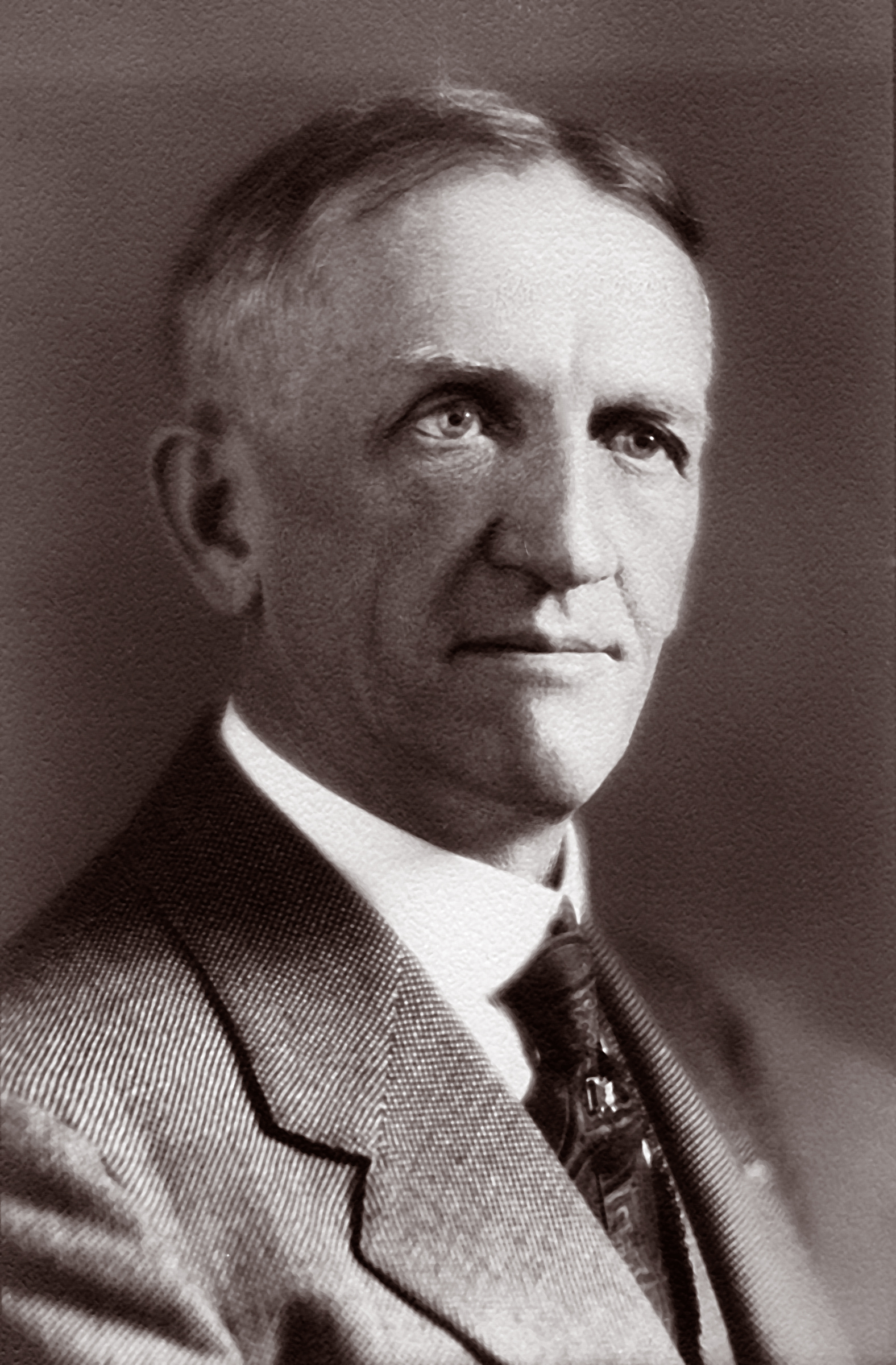
- May from the 1948 Michiganensian
- Born: July 8, 1872; Philadelphia, Pennsylvania, United States
- Died: March 28, 1948 (aged 75); Ann Arbor, Michigan, United States
- Years active: 1901–1942
- Known for: Athletic trainer and administrator

George Augustus May (July 8, 1872 – March 28, 1948) was an American gymnast, athletic trainer, and professor of physical education. A native of Philadelphia, he gained acclaim as a gymnast as a young man. He then worked for Yale University from 1896 to 1901 and for the University of Michigan from 1901 to 1942. He was a trainer and professor of physical education at Michigan.

== Early years ==
May was born in Philadelphia in 1872. His parents, George and Sophia May, were both natives of Hanover, Germany. His father was a baker. As a young man, he gained note as a gymnast in Philadelphia.

== Professional career ==
=== Yale ===
May moved to New Haven, Connecticut, in 1896 to become an instructor in gymnastics at Yale University and received an M.D. from the Yale Medical School in 1901. He worked for five years as an instructor in gymnastics at Yale in 1896.

=== Michigan ===
In 1901, May was hired by the University of Michigan as an instructor and physical examiner at the Waterman Gymnasium. In 1910, he was appointed as a professor of physical training and director of Waterman Gymnasium. He was also the trainer of the undefeated 1918 Michigan Wolverines football team that has been recognized as a national championship team. In 1922, he was promoted from the position of assistant professor to associate professor of physical education. May continued to be employed by the University of Michigan for 41 years. As of 1935, he still conducted a rigorous daily workout at age 64 and had reportedly not missed a day of work in 40 years. He retired in 1942 after reaching the compulsory retirement age of 70 and was granted the title associate professor emeritus of physical education. At the time of his retirement, he was still able to "swing expertly" on the parallel bars at the Waterman Gymnasium.

== Family and later years ==
May married Anna Marie Vaughan of Cleveland on New Year's Eve 1927. She died in 1933. They had no children. He died March 28, 1948, in Michigan's University Hospital. He left a trust fund valued at $124,000 to the University of Michigan for athletic scholarships under the name "The Dr. George A. May Scholarship Fund".

Preceded by Harry Tuthill	Michigan Wolverines football trainer 1918	Succeeded by Archie Hahn & William Fallon
