= Rob May =

English musician (born 1969)

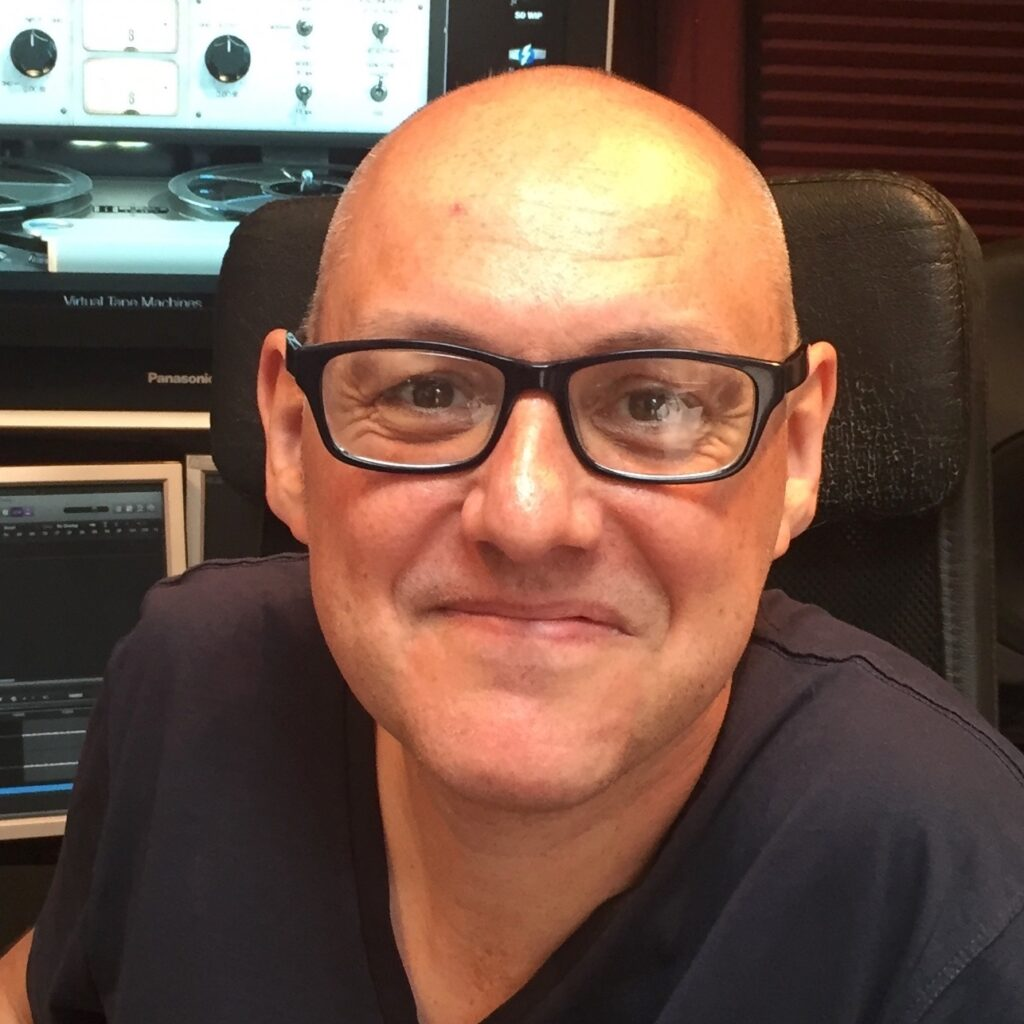

Background information
- Born: 15 February 1969 (age 57)
- Origin: East Ham, London
- Genres: Funk, soul, rock, jazz, RnB
- Occupations: Musician, songwriter, music producer, composer
- Instrument: Keyboards
- Years active: 1997–present

Rob May (born 15 February 1969, in London) is an English musician, songwriter and record producer.

May co-founded and toured with Beehive, who won a MOBO Best Gospel Act award in 1997 for their self-produced album, Brand New Day.

He has played keyboards for a number of acts including Honeyz, Misteeq, 911, Louise and Lulu. Production and mix credits include Alex Parks, Moya Brennan, RyanDan, Will Martin and Connie Talbot. He produced Connie Talbot’s ‘Over The Rainbow’, which achieved Gold status in the UK as well as Platinum Sales in Asia. The single ‘Three Little Birds’ reached number 1 in the US Billboard Hot Singles Sales chart.

TV writing and production credits include: "Good Morning Britain, Lingo, Piers Morgan Uncensored, 5 Gold Rings, Lorraine, Inside Out, Daybreak CNN, When Jordan met Peter, Toughest Place To Be A..., Sunday Morning Live, Janet Saves The Monarchy and Wogan Now & Then. He has also written and produced the theme tunes for Setanta Sports' Premiership, FA Cup and World Cup Football programmes. He has composed and produced the audio branding for UEFA Euro Qualifiers, Talk TV Channel launch, Vancouver Winter Olympics, UEFA Euro Qualifiers, Basketball Champions League, Champions Hockey League, CONCACAF Nations League, UEFA Futsal, Jeem TV, NRT TV, Pokerstars, Guinness ICC and the BAFTA Award Winning, 'It Was Alright In The...'Fame Academy 2 and Celebrity Fame Academy. He has been nominated for 2 Music and Sound Awards, for his work on Futsal and Talk TV He has composed and produced the Official Broadcast Theme for the 2010 Vancouver Winter Olympics called "City of Ice". In 2011, he produced and re-arranged the official FIFA anthem. Recently he has composed the official CONCACAF Nations League Theme, FIFA Africa Qualifiers, Basketball Champions League and Champions Hockey League Anthems.
