= Charles May (industrialist) =

English chemist, engineer and astronomer (1801–1860)

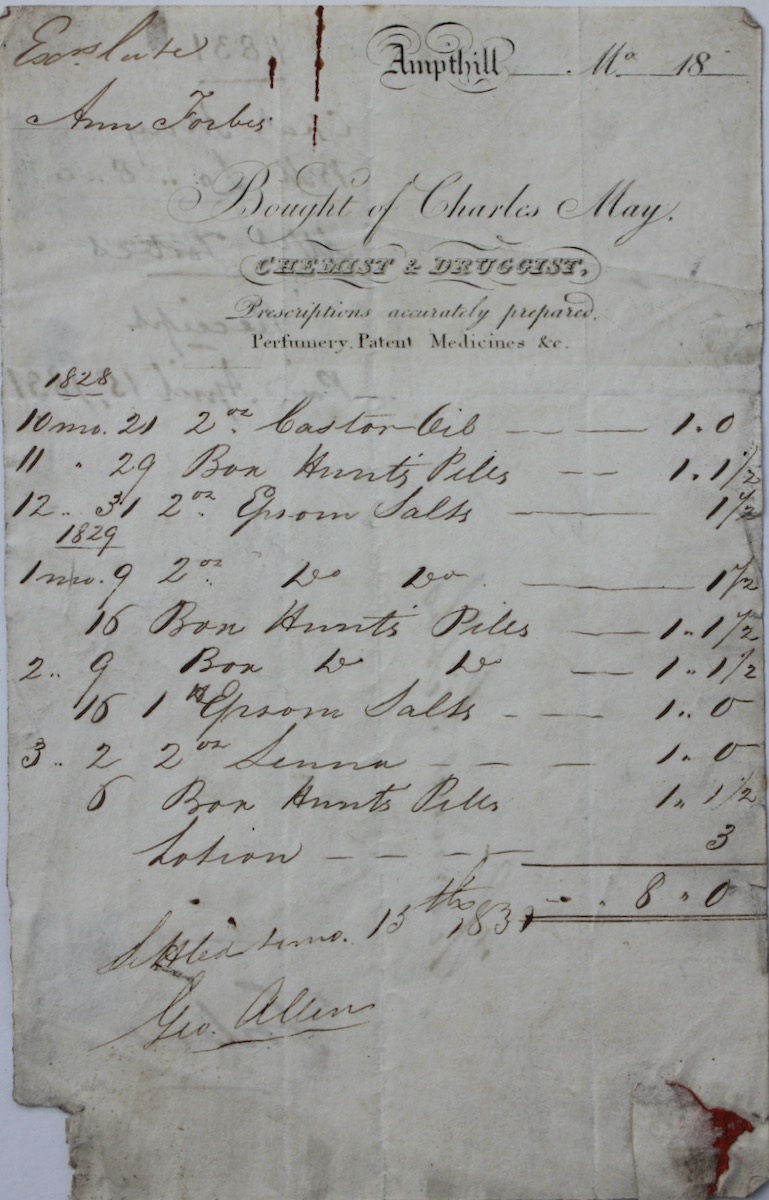
Receipt for prescription accurately prepared by Charles May

Charles May FRS (4 May 1801, Alton, Hampshire – 10 August 1860) was an English chemist, engineer and astronomer active in the mid-nineteenth century.

Charles was born the son of two Quakers, Samuel, a draper and Ann May. His brother Francis May was a co-founder of the Bryant and May match-making company. He served an apprenticeship with another Quaker, Ollive Sims, a chemist in Stockport, after which he set up in business as a chemist and druggist in Ampthill, Bedfordshire. On 24 April 1824 he married Ann Simms, daughter of Ollive Sims.

== Royal Society ==
May was elected as a Fellow of the Royal Society on 6 April 1843, having been proposed by Dr. George Witt of Bedford, Isambard Kingdom Brunel and John Herschel.
