= Stephen May (novelist) =

British novelist, playwright and TV writer (born 1964)

Stephen May (born 1964) is a British novelist, playwright and TV writer.

== Biography ==
Born in 1964, May grew up in Bedford and was educated at Bedford Modern School and the University of Essex.

After university, May was variously a barman, warehouseman, museum attendant, television writer and teacher. He had his first child while still at college after which he spent several years of struggle to support his family. This period of his life ‘largely informs his writing, and permeates through his first novel’ TAG which was on the 2009 Wales Book of the Year Long List. The book also won the Media Wales Peoples Choice award.

May's second novel, Life! Death! Prizes! was published in 2012 and shortlisted for the 2012 Costa Book Awards. The novel is narrated by Billy, a mixed-up teenager, struggling to raise his little brother after the death of their mother. It earned May comparisons to Dave Eggers and J.D. Salinger.

In 2014, May published his latest novel, Wake Up Happy Every Day. The Independent on Sunday's review of the book stated: “He riffs entertainingly on failure … Talk of misspent youth, assassins and obstreperous protagonists belies the emotional core which makes May's books moving”.

Interviewed by The Independent in 2014, May commented: “This country’s spirit is in places like Bedford, where I grew up, Kettering and Ipswich. The type of men I write about live outside big cities, lack self-confidence and rarely feature in contemporary fiction. Even Nick Hornby's characters are more sorted than mine."

In 2016 it was announced that Sandstone Press will publish his fourth novel Stronger Than Skin in spring 2017.

== Bibliography ==
=== Novels ===
- Wake Up Happy Every Day. Published by Bloomsbury, New York City, 2014
- Life! Death! Prizes! Published by Bloomsbury, London, 2012
- TAG. Published by Cinnamon Press, Blaenau Ffestiniog, 2008
- Stronger Than Skin. Published by Sandstone Academic Press, 2017

=== Plays ===
- The Reverse Is Also True (2015)
- The Valuation (2011)
- Ven Y Va (2010)
- Still Waiting For Everything (2005)
- Back The World (2003)

=== Textbooks ===
- Get Started in Creative Writing. Published by Hodder & Staughton, London, 2014
- Write A Novel And Get It Published. Published by Teach Yourself, London, 2012
