= Gary May (footballer) =

English footballer (born 1967)

Personal information
- Full name: Gary Colin May
- Date of birth: 7 May 1967 (age 59)
- Place of birth: Darlington, England
- Position: Midfielder

Youth career
- –: Darlington

Senior career*
Years	Team	Apps	(Gls)
1986–1987	Darlington	2	(0)
- * Club domestic league appearances and goals

Gary Colin May (born 7 May 1967) is an English former footballer who played twice as a midfielder in the Football League for Darlington before a broken leg forced his retirement. He worked as a holiday rep and as a flight attendant on a major commercial airline, and published a book about his experiences in the latter role. He went on to keep a pub.
