= Woody May =

American politician from Kentucky (1929–1995)

Member of the Kentucky Senate from the 27th district
- In office January 1, 1984 – November 25, 1991
- Preceded by: Woodrow Stamper
- Succeeded by: Walter Blevins

Majority Whip of the Kentucky House of Representatives
- In office January 8, 1980 – January 1, 1982
- Preceded by: Dwight A. Wells
- Succeeded by: James R. Dunn

Member of the Kentucky House of Representatives
- In office January 1, 1972 – January 1, 1982
- Preceded by: Sherman R. Arnett
- Succeeded by: Walter Blevins
- Constituency: 71st district
- In office January 1, 1968 – January 1, 1970
- Preceded by: Lynn B. Wells
- Succeeded by: Joe W. Haney
- Constituency: 98th district

Personal details
- Born: April 3, 1929
- Died: December 22, 1995 (aged 66)
- Party: Democratic

Woodford F. "Woody" May (April 3, 1929 – December 22, 1995) was an American politician from Kentucky who was a member of the Kentucky General Assembly. May was a member of the Kentucky House of Representatives from 1968 to 1970 and 1972 to 1982, and the Kentucky Senate from 1984 to 1991.

== Career ==
May was first elected to the house in 1967, representing the 98th district. In 1969, he was defeated for renomination by Joe W. Haney. Following the redistricting of the house, May was elected again in 1971 to represent the 71st district. He won reelection until he was defeated for renomination in 1981 by Walter Blevins.

In 1983, May was elected to the senate following the retirement of incumbent senator Woodrow Stamper. He won reelection in 1988.

On October 9, 1990, May had a stroke. Due to complications from the stroke, he resigned from the senate on November 25, 1991. He later died on December 22, 1995, at 65 years old.
