= Bobby May =

American juggler (Ludwig Theodore Mayer; 1907–1981)

Bobby May (born Ludwig Theodore Mayer, February 20, 1907 – November 7, 1981) was a vaudeville-era juggler. He is considered one of the best American jugglers.

== Biography ==
Bobby May was born in Cleveland, Ohio.

Bobby May performed his first professional act at Cleveland's Luna Park in 1923 along with a young Bob Hope.

One of May's most well-known acts involved juggling while ice-skating, which involved the use of three to five balls, clubs, hats, and cigarettes.

May was known for playing the harmonica as well as singing and dancing.

== See also ==
- List of jugglers

== Further material ==
- Bobby May: The Great American Juggler, a film by Stewart Lippe
- Howard, Alan (November–December 2005). "Bobby May: The International Juggler". Juggle.
