= George May (footballer, born 1875) =

Australian rules footballer (1875–1950)

Personal information
- Full name: George Arthur Massey May
- Born: 3 January 1875; Prahran, Victoria
- Died: 22 March 1950 (aged 75); Frankston, Victoria
- Original team: West Beach

Playing career^{1}
Years	Club	Games (Goals)
1898–1899	St Kilda	10 (1)
- ^{1} Playing statistics correct to the end of 1899.

George Arthur Massey May (3 January 1875 – 22 March 1950) was an Australian rules footballer who played with St Kilda in the Victorian Football League (VFL).
