= Robert G. May =

American accountant and academic administrator

Robert George May is an American retired accountant and academic administrator.

May earned his bachelor's and doctoral degrees from Michigan State University and began teaching at the University of Texas at Austin in 1979. He was named interim dean of the University of Texas College of Business Administration in 1995, and formally appointed to the post in 1996. He stepped down as dean in 2002, and remained on the faculty until his retirement from teaching in 2013. Over the course of his career at UTAustin, May held an endowed professorship in accounting, which changed its name from the KPMG Professorship, to the KPMG Peat Marwick Professorship, and by his retirement, had become known as the KPMG Centennial Professorship.

== Selected publications ==
- May, Robert G.; Mueller, Gerhard G.; Williams, Thomas H. (1975). A New Introduction to Financial Accounting. Prentice Hall. ISBN 9780136150213.
- May, Robert G.; Mueller, Gerhard G.; Williams, Thomas H. (1975). A Brief Introduction to Managerial and Social Uses of Accounting. Prentice Hall. ISBN 9780130820082.
