= Charles E. May =

American literary scholar

Charles E. May is a literary scholar specializing in the study of the short story. His published books include Short Stories Theories, The Modern European Short Story, Edgar Allan Poe: A Study of the Short Fiction, Fiction's Many Worlds, and The New Short Story Theories. He has also published over 200 articles in such journals as Studies in Short Fiction, Style, and The Minnesota Review. He currently maintains a blog titled "Reading the Short Story."

May is Emeritus Professor of English at California State University, Long Beach. Other academic positions he has held include president of the California State University English Council, and chairman of the C.S.U.L.B. English Department.
