= Robert C. May =

American philosopher

Education
- Education: Swarthmore College (BA); Massachusetts Institute of Technology (PhD)

Philosophical work
- Era: 21st-century philosophy
- Region: Western philosophy
- Institutions: University of California, Davis
- Main interests: Philosophy of language

Signature
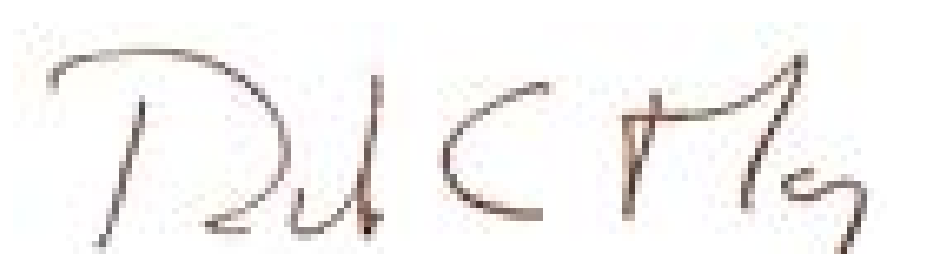

Robert C. May is an American philosopher and Distinguished Professor Emeritus of Philosophy at the University of California, Davis. He is known for his works on philosophy of language.

== Books ==
- Logical Form: Its Structure and Derivation. MIT Press, Cambridge, Ma., 1985.
- The Grammar of Quantification, Garland Publishing, New York, 1991.
- Indices and Identity, with Robert Fiengo. MIT Press, Cambridge, Ma., 1994.
- De Lingua Belief, with Robert Fiengo. MIT Press, Cambridge, Ma, 2006.
