= Mays =

Mays is a surname. Notable people with the surname include:

- Al Mays (1865–1905), American baseball pitcher
- Albert Mays (footballer) (1929–1973), Welsh professional footballer and amateur cricketer
- Alvoid Mays (born 1966), American football cornerback
- Aspen Mays (born 1980), American artist
- Benjamin Mays (1894–1984), American minister, educator, and social activist
- Bill Mays (born 1944), American jazz pianist
- Billy Mays (1958–2009), American television commercial salesman
- Billy Mays (footballer) (1902–1959), Welsh footballer
- Brad Mays (born 1955), independent filmmaker and stage director
- Brook Mays, investor in the Brook Mays Music Group
- Cade Mays (born 1999), American football player
- Carl Mays (1891–1971), American baseball player
- Carol Jean Mays (1933–2021), American politician from Missouri
- Carolene Mays (born 1961), American politician and government official
- Charles Mays (1941–2005), American Olympic athlete and politician
- Cooper Mays (born 2001), American football center
- Corey Mays (born 1983), American football linebacker
- Damon Mays (born 1968), American football wide receiver
- Daniel Mays (born 1978), English actor
- Dannite H. Mays (1852–1930), American farmer and politician
- David Mays (fl. 1980s–2000s), co-founder and co-owner of The Source magazine
- David J. Mays (1896–1971), lawyer and 1953 Pulitzer Prize winner
- Dave Mays (baseball) (1910–1993), American baseball player
- Dave Mays (born 1949), American football quarterback
- Devante Mays (born 1994), American football player
- Doris Crouse-Mays (born 1958), American labor leader
- Dorothy Mays (born 1957), American model and actress
- Eaddy Mays (fl. 2010s–2020s), American actress and producer
- Eddie Lee Mays (1929–1963), last person to be executed by the state of New York
- Eric Mays (1958–2024), American politician
- Frank Mays (born 1990), American football defensive lineman
- Cities Aviv (Gavin Mays; born 1989), American rapper
- Gerry Mays (1921–2006), Scottish football player and manager
- Isaiah Mays (1858–1925), Buffalo Soldier in the United States Army and winner of the Medal of Honor
- J Mays (born 1954), American industrial designer and Group Vice President of Design for the Ford Motor Company
- James Mays (born 1986), American-born Central African basketball player
- James C. Mays (1953–2022), bilingual Canadian historian
- James Henry Mays (1868–1926), American lawyer, businessman, and politician
- James Luther Mays (1921–2015), American Old Testament scholar
- James P. Mays (fl. 1860s–1870s), member of the South Carolina House of Representatives
- Jayma Mays (born 1979), American actress
- Jefferson Mays (born 1965), American actor
- Jermaine Mays (born 1979), American football cornerback
- Jerry Mays (defensive lineman) (1939–1994), American football player
- Jerry Mays (running back) (born 1967), American football player
- Jimmy Mays (fl. 1970s–2010s), American polymer scientist, academic, and author
- Joe Mays (pitcher) (born 1975), American baseball player
- Joe Mays (catcher) (1914–1986), American baseball player
- Joe Mays (American football) (born 1985), American football player
- Keddric Mays (born 1984), American professional basketball player
- Kivuusama Mays (born 1975), American football linebacker
- Lee Mays (born 1978), American football player
- Lisa Mays (born 2000), Australian tennis player
- Lowry Mays (1935–2022), founder and current chairman of Clear Channel Communication
- Lyle Mays (1953–2020), American jazz pianist and composer
- Malcolm Mays (born 1990), American actor, musician, and filmmaker
- Mark Mays, president and CEO of Clear Channel Communications
- Matt Mays (born 1979), Canadian singer-songwriter
- Maxwell Mays (1918–2009), American painter
- Melinda Mays (born 1962), American model and actress
- Morley J. Mays (1911–1998), American academic
- Oris Mays (1935–1996), American preacher, gospel singer and songwriter
- Raymond Mays (1899–1980), English auto racing driver
- Reta Mays (born 1975), American serial killer
- Rex Mays (1913–1949), American race car driver
- Richard Mays (born 1943), American politician and judge
- Sadie Gray Mays (1900–1969), American social worker
- Samuel H. Mays Jr. (born 1948), judge of the United States District Court for the Western District of Tennessee
- Skylar Mays (born 1997), American professional basketball player
- Stafford Mays (born 1958), American football player
- Taylor Mays (born 1988), American football player
- Tom Mays (born 1954), American politician
- Trent Mays (born c. 1996), convicted rapist
- Travis Mays (born 1968), American basketball player
- Tristin Mays (born 1990), American actress
- Vickie Mays (fl. 1990s–2020s), American psychologist known for research on racial disparities in health
- Willie Mays (1931–2024), American baseball player
- Wolfe Mays (1912–2005), British philosopher
- Zilla Mays (1931–1995), American R&B and gospel singer

== See also ==
- Mayes, a surname
- Z. mays
- Mais (disambiguation)
- Maye (disambiguation)
- May (disambiguation)
