= Mays (disambiguation) =

Mays is a surname. Mays or MAYS may also refer to:

- Cooper Mays (born 2001), American football player
- Micah Mays Jr. (born 2005), American football player
- May Anthologies ("The Mays"), anthologies of new writing by Oxford and Cambridge University students
- Mays, Indiana, a small town in the United States
- May Bumps, an annual June rowing event on the River Cam in Cambridge, England
- J.W. Mays, an American department store
- Mays Business School, at Texas A&M University
- Metropolitan Area Youth Symphony, a youth orchestra in Central Florida

== See also ==
- Mays Hill, New South Wales, suburb of Sydney, New South Wales, Australia
- Mays Lick, Kentucky, census-designated place in Mason County, Kentucky
- Mays Point, New York, hamlet in the Town of Tyre, Seneca County, New York
- May (disambiguation)
- Mayes, a surname
- Maize (disambiguation)
- Maze (disambiguation)
- Mais (disambiguation)
- Maye (disambiguation)
