= James Mays =

James Mays may refer to:

- James C. Mays (1953–2022), Canadian historian
- James Dixon Mays (born 1986), American-born naturalized Central African basketball player
- James Henry Mays (1868–1926), U.S. Representative
- James Luther Mays (1921–2015), Old Testament scholar
- James P. Mays (fl. 1860s–1870s), member of the South Carolina House of Representatives

== See also ==
- Jayma Mays (born 1979), American actress
- Jimmy Mays (fl. 1970s–2010s), American polymer scientist, academic, and author
- James May (disambiguation)
