= White corn =

White corn may mean:

- White varieties of field corn (U.S. usage)
- Whitecorn, Missouri, a community in the United States

== See also ==
- Maize (disambiguation)
- White (disambiguation)
- Corn (disambiguation)
