= James May (disambiguation) =

James May (born 1963) is an English television presenter and journalist.

James or Jim May may also refer to:

- Sir James May, 1st Baronet (1723–1811), Anglo-Irish politician
- James May (body snatcher), British member of London Burkers
- James May (footballer) (1877–?), Scottish footballer
- James Vance May (1873–1947), American psychiatrist
- Jim May (Australian footballer) (1910–1979), Australian rules footballer
- James May (vascular surgeon) (1934-2021), Australian vascular surgeon
- Jim May (chemical engineer) (1934–2023), Australian chemical engineer and metallurgist
- Jim May (soccer) (born 1953), American soccer goalkeeper
- James May (gymnast) (born 1968), British Olympic gymnast
- Jim May (tennis) (born 1981), British tennis player

== See also ==
- James Disney-May (born 1992), swimmer
- James Mays (disambiguation)
