= William Mayes =

William Mayes may refer to:

- William Mayes (cricketer) (1885–1946), English cricketer
- William Edward Mayes (1861–1952), English painter
- William Harding Mayes (1861–1939), American journalist

== See also ==
- William Mayes Fry (1896–1992), Royal Air Force fighter ace
- William Mays (disambiguation)
- William May (disambiguation)
- Billy Mays (disambiguation)
- Mayes (surname)
