= Carole Roper Park =

American politician (born 1939)

Member of the Missouri House of Representatives from the 51st district
- In office January 6, 1993 – January 4, 1995
- Preceded by: Carol Jean Mays
- Succeeded by: Dennis Bonner

Member of the Missouri House of Representatives from the 52nd district
- In office January 5, 1983 – January 6, 1993
- Preceded by: Thomas Barklage
- Succeeded by: W. T. "Bill" Dawson

Member of the Missouri House of Representatives from the 35th district
- In office January 5, 1977 – January 5, 1983
- Preceded by: Charlotte Waits
- Succeeded by: Alex Fazzino

Personal details
- Born: September 18, 1939 (age 86) Kansas City, Missouri
- Party: Democratic

Carole Roper Park (born September 18, 1939) is an American politician who served in the Missouri House of Representatives from 1977 to 1995.

== Early life and education ==
Carole Roper Park was born in Sugar Creek, Missouri, a small town wedged between Kansas City and Independence, Missouri. Her mother, Rose Mus, had moved there from Strawberry Hill, a neighborhood of Croatian people in Kansas City, Kansas, to be with her father, Rudolph Joseph “Rudy” Roper. She is the second of four children. All four of her grandparents had emigrated to Missouri from Croatia, in the former Yugoslavia. Her father's father worked for 70 years in the Standard Oil refinery located in Sugar Creek. Her father was elected mayor in Sugar Creek in 1940, in protest against a company-ruled town, and went on to serve for 40 years. This is what Roper Park attributes her interest in politics to.

Roper Park went to the Sugar Creek grade school, Northeast High School and later Van Horn High School. She then attended the University of Miami in Coral Gables, Florida, for two years, but returned to Missouri due to family heath issues. She then attended the University of Kansas for a semester before leaving school to work in retail. After a couple of years she married, in 1961, and had a child, Jennifer Park, in 1962. When her daughter was about six months old she and her husband separated. She returned to college and received a teaching degree from the University of Missouri–Kansas City. Upon graduation, she returned to Kansas City to teach elementary school.

== Political career ==
Roper Park was elected to the Missouri House of Representatives in November 1976, and served until January 4, 1995; first representing the 35th district.(January 5, 1977 to January 5, 1983), then the 52nd district (January 5, 1983 to January 6, 1993), and finally, the 51st district (January 6, 1993 to January 4, 1995).
