= Mayet =

Mayet may refer to:

- Mayet (ancient Egypt), an Ancient Egyptian mummy
- Mayet, Sarthe, a commune of Sarthe, France
- Mayet (surname), a surname

== See also ==
- Maat, an Ancient Egyptian goddess
