= Westland Mall (Florida) =

Shopping mall in Hialeah, Florida, United States

Coordinates: 25°52′5″N 80°19′5″W

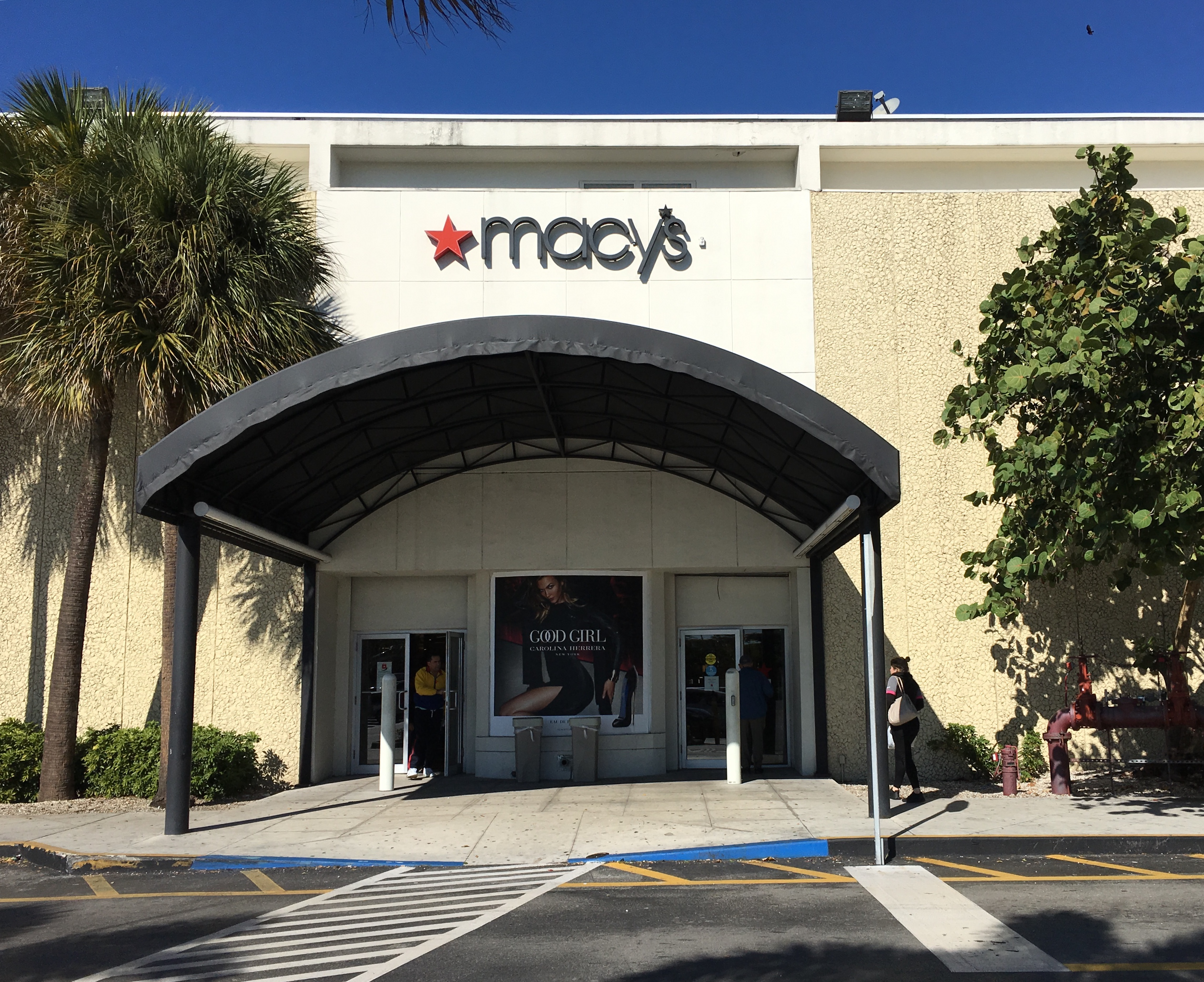
- Macy's entrance
- Location: Hialeah, Florida
- Address: 1675 West 49th Street, Hialeah, FL 33012
- Opened: Summer 1969
- Developer: Joseph Meyerhoff
- Manager: Centennial Real Estate
- Owner: Centennial Real Estate
- Num. of stores: 100
- Num. of anchor tenants: 2
- Floor area: 1
- Floors: 1 (2 in H&M, JCPenney, Macy's)
- Parking: Surface lot
- Website: http://www.ShoppingWestlandMall.com

Westland Mall (formerly Westfield Westland) is a shopping mall in Hialeah, Florida, United States. The anchor stores are Macy's and JCPenney.

The mall has over 100 stores. Westland Mall has several restaurants, Fuddruckers, Chili's, Outback Steakhouse, IHOP and a food court with Subway, Charlys Grill Subs and more. The mall experiences about 10 to 12 thousand people daily or 70000-84000 people weekly. from the Miami metropolitan area.

== History ==
The mall, then named "Westland Mall", opened in the summer of 1969, after the mall was built to the east of the then standalone Burdines Department Store. At that time its anchors were Sears, Burdines, JCPenney and Mays. Its restaurants included 2 cafeterias and a Farrell's Ice Cream parlor. In Spring 1994, The McDonalds in Westland mall opened Along with the new food court.

In November 2007, the Westfield Group acquired the mall from Simon Property Group and renamed it “Westfield Westland”. The name was reverted in 2012 when the mall was sold to Starwood Capital Group.

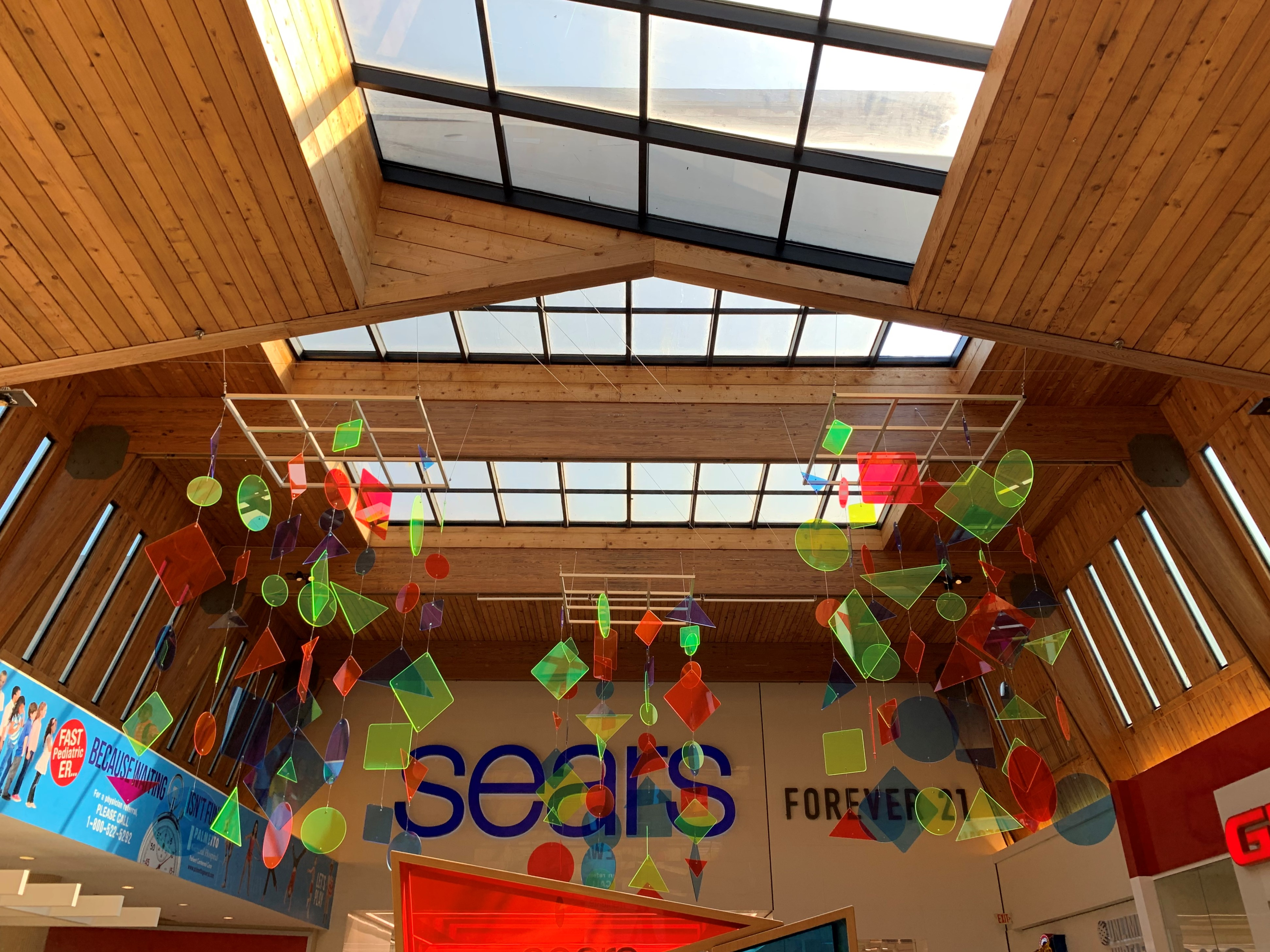
Decorations in front of former Sears

In 2015, Sears Holdings spun off 235 of its properties, including the Sears at Westland Mall, into Seritage Growth Properties. Sears downsized the first level for Forever 21 and Xfinity.

On November 7, 2019, it was announced that Sears would be closing this location as part of a plan to close 96 stores nationwide. The store closed in February 2020.

In Mid 2023, IT'SUGAR in Westland mall was reported as opened.

In Mid 2024, The McDonald's in the food court was reported as permanently closed.

In Early 2025, The IT'SUGAR store has been permanently closed, as said in the malls directory.

The McDonald's before it closed down

As of 2026, the former Sears department store site was purchased by a development company who is redeveloping the former Sears. The site of the former Sears is set to be converted into a lifestyle center. The lifestyle center is set to include retail stores, restaurants, and housings. It is currently under development.
