= Dumais =

Dumais is a French-Canadian surname.

== Persons ==
People with this surname include:

- Clarence C. Dumais, U.S. Navy officer, namesake of Antarctic mountain Mount Dumais
- Daniel Dumais, Canadian judge
- Jocelyn Dumais, Canadian politician
- Joseph A. Dumais, a person involved in the Black Dhalia case
- Justin Dumais (born 1978), U.S. Olympic diver
- Kathleen Dumais (born 1958), U.S. politician
- Marc Dumais, Canadian Forces general
- Paschal Dumais (1798–1783), Canadian politician
- Paul Dumais (born 1991), Canadian weightlifter
- Raymond Dumais (1950–2012), Roman Catholic bishop
- Séverin Dumais (1840–1907), Canadian politician
- Susan Dumais, U.S. computer scientist
- Troy Dumais (born 1980) U.S. competitive diver
- Victor Dumais, namesake of the AIAPQ Victor Dumais Trophy

== See also ==
- Mais (disambiguation)
- DU (disambiguation)
