= Amazed (disambiguation) =

"Amazed" is a song by Lonestar from the 1999 album Lonely Grill.

Amazed may also refer to:

== Music ==
- Amazed (album), a 2002 album by Lincoln Brewster
- "Amazed", a song by The Offspring from Ixnay on the Hombre
- "Amazed", a song by Poe from Haunted
- "Amazed", a song by Kutless from their album It Is Well

== See also ==
- "I'm Amazed", a song by My Morning Jacket
- Maze (disambiguation)
