= Mais =

Mais may refer to:

== People ==
- Alan Mais, Baron Mais (1911–1993), a British politician and Lord Mayor of London
- John A. Mais (1888–1961), German auto racer
- Roger Mais (1905–1955), a Jamaican journalist, novelist, poet, and playwright
- S. P. B. Mais (1885–1975), a prolific British author, journalist and broadcaster
- Mais Hamdan (born 1982), a Jordanian actress, singer and television presenter

== Other uses ==
- Mais (album), an album by Brazilian singer Marisa Monte
- Mayıs (also Mais), a village in the Lachin Rayon of Azerbaijan
- Mais (Bowness), a Roman fort on Hadrian's Wall, Cumbria, England
- Band Mais, a television station in Campinas, São Paulo, Brazil

== See also ==
- MAIS (disambiguation)
- Mai (disambiguation)
- Maize (disambiguation)
- Mayes, a surname
- Mays, a surname
- Dumais, a surname
