= Mace =

Mace may refer to:

== Spices ==
- Mace (spice), derived from the aril of nutmeg
- Achillea ageratum, known as English mace, a flowering plant once used as a herb

== Weapons ==
- Mace (bludgeon), a weapon with a heavy head on a solid shaft used to bludgeon opponents
  - Flail (weapon), a spiked weapon on a chain, sometimes called a chain mace or mace-and-chain
  - Ceremonial mace, an ornamented mace used in civic ceremonies
  - Gada (mace), the blunt mace or club from India
    - Kaumodaki, the gada (mace) of the Hindu god Vishnu
- Mace (spray), a brand of tear gas, often used by police
- MGM-13 Mace, a U.S. tactical surface-to-surface missile
- Multi-mission Affordable Capacity Effector, a U.S. air-launched cruise missile
- Northrop Grumman M-ACE, a U.S. counter unmanned air system

== Science and technology ==
- Major adverse cardiovascular events, a criterion for evaluating cardiovascular disease treatments such as angioplasty
- Malone antegrade continence enema, a surgical procedure used to create a continent pathway proximal to the anus
- Major Atmospheric Cerenkov Experiment Telescope, a telescope being built by ECIL to be placed at Hanle
- Models And Counter-Examples, a computer software for model generation
- Metal assisted chemical etching
- Multi Atomic Cluster Expansion, a machine learning architecture for a chemical force field

== Arts and entertainment ==
- Mace (G.I. Joe), a fictional character in the G.I. Joe universe
- Sgt. Colt "Mace" Howards, a fictional character in the 1988 animated TV series COPS
- Mace, a fictional character in the 1995 film Strange Days
- Mace, a fictional character in the 2007 film Sunshine
- M.A.C.E. Music, an American record label
- Mace: The Dark Age, a 1997 video game
- Mace Windu, a fictional character in the Star Wars universe
- Mace Tyrell, a fictional character in the A Song of Ice and Fire book series and its TV adaption Game of Thrones

== Businesses and organizations ==
- Mace (construction company), an international consultancy and construction company
- Mace (retailer), a convenience store chain in the UK and Ireland
- Mace Security International, a manufacturer of personal defense products, e.g. Mace pepper spray
- Mar Athanasius College of Engineering, an Indian engineering college
- Media Archive for Central England, a public sector regional film archive that collects, preserves and provides access to moving image material
- Metropolitan Architectural Consortium for Education

== People ==
- Mace (surname), a list of people
- Mace (crossword compiler), a pseudonym of crossword compiler Margaret Irvine (1948–2023)
- Mace (wrestler) (Dio Maddin; born 1991), American professional wrestler
- Mace Brown (1909–2002), American baseball player
- Mace Coronel (born 2004), American actor
- Mace Francis (born 1978), Australian composer and academic
- Mace Matiosian, American sound editor
- Mace Neufeld (1928–2022), American film producer

== Places ==
- Macé, Normandy, France
- Mače, Croatia
- Mače, Slovenia
- Mace, Indiana, U.S.
- Hill 262 in Normandy, France, known as the "Mace" in World War II

== Other uses ==
- Mace (unit), an English term for a traditional Chinese measurement of weight
- Mace debating, a particular style of debating
- Member of the Australian College of Educators

== See also ==
- Mase (disambiguation)
- Maze (disambiguation)
- Mace's Hole, the former name of Beulah, Colorado, U.S.
