= Billy Mays (disambiguation) =

Billy Mays (1958–2009) was an American salesperson and pitchman for various infomercials.

Billy Mays or William Mays may also refer to:

- Billy Mays (footballer) (1902–1959), Welsh footballer
- Bill Mays (born 1944), American jazz pianist
- Willie Mays (1931–2024), American baseball player
- William Mayes (disambiguation)
- William May (disambiguation)
