= The Negro's Church =

African American history book

- Title page for The Negro's Church (1933)
- Author: Joseph Micholson; Benjamin Mays
- Language: English
- Genre: Non-fiction
- Publisher: Institute of Social Religious Research
- Publication date: 1933
- Publication place: United States

The Negro’s Church (New York: Institute of Social and Religious Research, 1933) is a book by Joseph Nicholson and Benjamin Mays. It highlights the origins of African-American religion and how it became a way to cope under racist oppression. It said the songs, hymns, and dances of that culture were a way to "endure suffering and survive as it helped blacks get through heartache with the music of the soil and the soul".

In Chapter VI (titled "The Message of the Minister") the authors performed a systematic study of 100 sermons in order to evaluate the "teaching quality" by the minister in each Negro church. They separated the sermons into "three classes: those that touch on life situations, sermons that are doctrinal or theological, and those that are predominantly other-worldly". They then critiqued each of the 100 sermons and worked to further classify them.

== Footnotes ==
- The book was reprinted by Russell & Russell, 1969; and Arno Press, 1969
