= Maye =

Maye may refer to:

- Maye (surname), including a list of people with the name
- Maye (singer), Venezuelan-born American singer-songwriter.
- Glen Maye, a small village on the west coast of the Isle of Man

== See also ==
- May (surname)
- Mayes
- Mays (disambiguation)
