= Mayes =

Mayes is a surname. Notable people with the surname include:

- Adrian Mayes (born 1980), American football player
- Alan Mayes (born 1953), English footballer
- Bernard Mayes (1929–2014), British-American lecturer and author
- Cassandra Mayes, American politician
- Clifford Mayes (born 1953), American professor of education
- Clyde Mayes (born 1953), American professional basketball player
- Colin Mayes (born 1948), Canadian politician
- Derrick Mayes (born 1974), American football player
- Frances Mayes (born 1940), American university professor, poet, memoirist, essayist, and novelist
- Ian Mayes, British journalist and editor
- Jeff Mayes (born 1971), American politician
- Joel B. Mayes (1833–1891), Chief of the Cherokee Nation
- Johnny Mayes (1947–2025), Australian rugby league player
- Kris Mayes (born 1970/71), American attorney, reporter, and politician who is the Arizona Attorney General
- Pete Mayes (1938–2008), American blues singer, guitarist and songwriter
- Richard Mayes (1922–2006), English stage and television actor
- Robert Burns Mayes (1867–1921), justice of the Supreme Court of Mississippi
- Ron Mayes (born 1954), American educator and author
- Rueben Mayes (born 1963), Canadian football player
- Rufus Mayes (1947–1990), American football player
- Samuel Houston Mayes (1845–1927), Chief of the Cherokee Nation from 1895 to 1899
- Sean Mayes (1949–1995), English rock musician and author
- Wendell Wise Mayes Jr. (1924–2021), American radio and cable television executive
- William Mayes Jr., prominent pirate, proprietor of White Horse Tavern (Rhode Island)
- William Edward Mayes (1861–1952), English painter

== See also ==
- Mays (disambiguation)
- Maze (disambiguation)
- Maize (disambiguation)
- Mais (disambiguation)
- Maye (disambiguation)
