= MAIS =

MAIS may refer to:

- Master of Advanced International Studies
- Mallya Aditi International School
- Maximum Abbreviated Injury Scale, a code used by medical professionals to describe the most severe injury that a trauma patient has sustained under the Abbreviated Injury Scale
- Mild androgen insensitivity syndrome
- Mississippi Association of Independent Schools
- Mongol Aspiration School, an international school in Ulaanbaatar, Mongolia

== See also ==
- Mais (disambiguation)
