= Mase (disambiguation) =

Mase (born 1975) is an American rapper.

Mase or Masé may also refer to:

== People ==
- Chigaya Mase (間瀬ちがや?, b. 1967), Japanese ski mountaineer
- Evelyn Mase (1922–2004), nurse, first wife of Nelson Mandela
- Shuichi Mase (間瀬 秀一; born 1973), Japanese footballer and manager
- Takumi Mase (真瀬 拓海; born 1998), Japanese footballer
- Dana Mase, American pop singer and songwriter
- Marino Masé (b. 1939), Italian film actor
- Vincent Mason (rapper) (b. 1970), American rapper, producer, DJ

== Other uses ==
- Mase, Switzerland, former municipality in the district of Hérens in the canton of Valais in Switzerland
- Mean absolute scaled error (MASE), a measure of accuracy of forecasts

== See also ==
- Mace (disambiguation)
- Maze (disambiguation)
