= William May =

William May may refer to:

== Politicians ==
- William L. May (1793–1849), U.S. representative from Illinois
- William May (Northern Ireland politician) (1909–1962), unionist politician in Northern Ireland
- William May (MP for Tavistock), English politician, Member of Parliament for Tavistock, 1413–1421
- Bill May (Washington politician) (1902–1989), American politician, Washington State Representative

== Sports ==
- William May (cricketer) (died 1888), English cricketer
- William W. May (1887–1979), American Olympic sprinter
- Bill May (American football, fl. 1913–15), American football player
- Bill May (American football, born 1913) (1913–2004), American football player
- Bill May (synchronized swimmer) (born 1979), American synchronized swimmer
- Bill May (soccer) (born 1974), retired American soccer goalkeeper
- Billy May (footballer) (1865–1936), English footballer
- Willie May (1936–2012), American hurdler
- Buckshot May (William Herbert May, 1899–1984), American baseball player

== Theologians ==
- William May (theologian) (died 1560), English divine
- William E. May (1928–2014), American moral theologian

== Others ==
- William May (pirate) (fl. 1690–1700), privateer and pirate active in the Indian Ocean
- William May (artistic director) (1953–2009), American-born Australian artistic director, creator of Walking with Dinosaurs - The Live Experience
- William F. May (chemical engineer) (1915–2011), American co-founder of the Film Society of Lincoln Center
- William F. May (ethicist) (born 1927), American ethicist
- William May (Royal Navy officer) (1849–1930), British admiral active in 1910s
- William Charles May (1853–1931), English sculptor and painter
- Billy May (1916–2004), American composer, arranger and musician
- Willie E. May, American chemist and standards and technology administrator
- William May (Marvel Cinematic Universe)

== See also ==
- William Mays (disambiguation)
- William Mayes (disambiguation)
