= Maze River =

Maze River may refer to:

- Maze River (Democratic Republic of the Congo)
- Maze River (Ethiopia)
- Maze River (Japan)

== See also ==
- Maze (disambiguation)
