= Mayet (surname) =

Mayet is a surname. Notable people with the surname include:

- Carl Mayet (1810–1868), German chess player
- Jean-François Mayet (born 1940), French politician
- Muhammed Mayet (born 1998), South African cricketer
- Valéry Mayet (1839–1909), French entomologist

== See also ==
- Maye (surname)
