= Maye (surname) =

Origin
- Region of origin: England

Other names
- Variant forms: May, Mayes, Mays

Maye is an English surname variant of May. It is uncommon as a given name. People with the surname include:

- Cory Maye (born 1980), American prisoner
- Drake Maye (born 2002), American football player
- Lee Maye (1934–2002), American baseball player and singer
- Luke Maye (born 1997), American basketball player
- Marcus Maye (born 1993), American football player
- Paul Maye (1913–1987), French cyclist
- Marilyn Maye (born 1928), American jazz singer

== Fictional ==
- Tiffany Maye, a university student and a dateable character in the dating simulation videogame HuniePop
- Jessie Maye, mother of Tiffany Maye and a dateable character in the dating simulation videogame HuniePop
- Fiona Maye, High Court Judge in the movie The Children Act (film)

== See also ==
- May (surname)
- Mayes
- Mays (disambiguation)
