= Sadie Gray Mays =

African-American social worker and civil rights activist

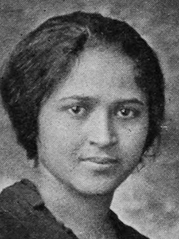
- Sadie Gray Mays, from a 1924 publication.
- Born: Sadie M. Gray; August 5, 1900; Gray, Jones County, Georgia, US
- Died: October 10, 1969 (aged 69); Atlanta, Georgia, US
- Occupation: social worker
- Years active: 1930s-1960s
- Known for: Sadie G. Mays Health and Rehabilitation Center in Atlanta

Sadie Gray Mays (August 5, 1900 – October 10, 1969) was an African-American social worker, trained at the University of Chicago. As the wife of Benjamin Mays, she was also a prominent Baptist minister's wife, a college president's wife (at Morehouse College, from 1940 to 1967), and a civil rights activist.

== Early life ==
Sadie M. Gray was born in Gray, Georgia, the daughter of James Seaman Gray and Emma Frances Blount Gray. Her father was a farmer who was born in slavery, understood to be the son of James Madison Gray, a prominent white landowner in Jones County, Georgia and the namesake of Gray, Georgia. She had four older brothers and four older sisters. Her brother Madison and her sister Emma became professors at Paine College in Augusta, Georgia; her brother Emory became a dentist.

Sadie M. Gray attended Paine College, and earned a bachelor's degree (1924) and a master's degree (1931), both from the University of Chicago's Department of Social Service Administration.

== Career ==
In the 1920s she taught at South Carolina State College in Orangeburg. She later taught at the Atlanta University School of Social Work. She was a social worker for the Georgia Study of Negro Child Welfare in Atlanta, and for the National Urban League in Tampa, Florida. In the 1930s, while her husband was a dean at Howard University, she was a social worker at the National Youth Administration. She also taught at Howard University and at Spelman College. She was a member of the Women's International League for Peace and Freedom, and a life member of the NAACP.

Sadie Gray Mays frequently lectured on social topics. In 1943, she and her husband were speakers at the Institute on Socio-Religious Affairs, held in Augusta, Georgia. Her talk included a discussion of sexism and internalized misogyny: "Men ask women to do more work for less pay. Men see to it that women do not get jobs unless there is no man available or the work deals entirely with women. Women have been in this inferior position so long they tend to accept it. Some even have a technique of trying to make men feel superior. Many refuse to reach heights that they could because they fear men will not approve."

In 1947 she helped to establish and was first president of the Atlanta Association for Convalescent Aged Persons, a non-profit organization created to open Happy Haven, a nursing home for elderly black residents of the city.

== Personal life and legacy ==
Sadie M. Gray married Baptist minister and academic Benjamin E. Mays in 1926. He was president of Morehouse College from 1940 to 1967. She died in 1969, aged 69 years, in Atlanta. She lived at Happy Haven in her last months, and the nursing home was renamed the Sadie G. Mays Memorial Nursing Home (now the Sadie G. Mays Health and Rehabilitation Center) in her memory. The Mayses share a memorial on the campus of Morehouse College. The Benjamin E. Mays Papers are archived at Howard University, and include much personal correspondence of Sadie Gray Mays. In 2010, actress Veronica Byrd presented a program called "Sweet Sadie: The Life and Times of Sadie Gray Mays" in Atlanta for Black History Month.
