= Daniel Dumais =

The Honourable Daniel Dumais, LL.B., LL.M., is a Judge at the Superior Court of Quebec. appointed since April, 2014.

He received a Bachelor of Laws degree from the University of Laval in 1981, was called to the Barreau du Quebec in 1982 and received a Master of Law degree from Osgoode Hall Law School in 1987. Prior to being appointed he practiced at Heenan Blaikie and Norton Rose, lectured in law at the University of Laval and was recognized by Best Lawyers Canada list in the area of sports law. In 2012 he received the Emeritus Lawyer distinction from the Barreau du Quebec. He was appointed as Puisne Judge of the Superior Court of Quebec in April, 2014.
