= James May (footballer) =

Scottish footballer (born 1877)

Personal information
- Full name: James May
- Date of birth: 1877
- Place of birth: Cambusnethan, Scotland
- Position: Winger

Senior career*
Years	Team	Apps	(Gls)
1897	St Mirren		
1897–1898	Preston North End	3	(0)
Total		3	(0)
- * Club domestic league appearances and goals

James May (1877–unknown) was a Scottish footballer who played in the Football League for Preston North End.
