= Alex Fazzino =

American politician

Member of the U.S. House of Representatives from Missouri's 22nd district
- Preceded by: Frank C. Mazzuca

Missouri House of Representatives
- Incumbent
- Assumed office 1969

Personal details
- Born: 1923 Kansas City, Missouri, US
- Died: 2005 (aged 81–82) Overland Park, Kansas, US
- Resting place: Mount Saint Mary Catholic Cemetery near Kansas City, Missouri
- Party: Democratic
- Spouse: Marguerite Passantino
- Children: 2
- Occupation: businessman

Alex Joseph Fazzino (January 18, 1923 - July 28, 2005) was an American Democratic politician who served for over 20 years as a Missouri state legislator. He was born in Kansas City, Missouri, and was educated at Garfield Grade School and Northeast High School in Kansas City. In 1946, he married Marguerite Passantino in Kansas City.
