= James Vance May =

American physician (1873–1947)

James Vance May (1873–1947) was an American psychiatrist and an early proponent for statistical studies and classification of mental diseases. He was among the first to recognize mental disease as a public health problem, a view that did not gain recognition and acceptance for many years.

May was born in Lawrence, Kansas. He received his AB at the University of Kansas in 1894 and his medical degree at the University of Pennsylvania in 1899. He was a resident at the Pennsylvania Hospital in Philadelphia for one year then moved to the Brigham Hall Hospital in Canandaigua, New York, a private mental hospital where he was in charge of the pathology department and its laboratory. From 1900 to 1902, he served in the U.S. Army during the Philippine insurrection (Philippine War of Independence; Spanish–American War).

Following his Army service, he began to work at the New York State Mental Hospital System in Central Islip, New York, but after a short stay, he transferred to the Binghamton State Hospital and stayed until 1911. He became superintendent of the Matteawan State Hospital for the Criminally Insane in 1911, and then moved to another position as medical member of the New York State Hospital Commission. In 1916, he moved to Massachusetts to become the superintendent of the Grafton State Hospital. Soon thereafter, he transferred to the Boston State Hospital where he stayed as superintendent from 1912 to 1936.

In 1913, the American Medico Psychological Association (later the American Psychiatric Association) established a committee on statistics and May was appointed to serve as a committee member. He stayed involved with the committee for nineteen years and was the committee chair for ten years. As an administrator, he was interested in mental hospital statistics and the classification of mental diseases, which were not uniform in the United States. His interest and work in these areas culminated in a publication in 1922 of the book Mental Disease: A Public Health Problem, at a time when mental disease was not viewed as a public health issue. The committee on statistics proposed a system of classification of mental disease which was adopted by the organization and became a basis for future change in keeping with advancements in psychiatric research and practice.

May contributed numerous research articles to the scholarly literature. He spoke German and nearly completed a German-English dictionary of psychiatric terms. He translated a book on schizophrenia by the German psychiatrist Karl Wilmanns.

He was a member of many professional and civic groups including the New England Psychiatric Society (president, 1931–1934), the American Psychiatric Association (president, 1932–1933), board of directors of the Massachusetts Society for Mental Hygiene, the Boston Occupational Therapy Society, the Boston City Club, the American Legion, and the Royal Medical Psychological Society of Great Britain.

May died in 1947.

== Works ==
- May, James V. "A Review of the Recent Studies of General Paresis", Proceedings of the American Medico-Psychological Association (1909): 333–340.
- —— "The Juvenile Form of General Paresis, with Report of a Case", The Medical Record (1910): 404–407.
- —— "The Laboratory Diagnosis of General Paresis", The Archives of Internal Medicine 8 (1911): 183–192.
- —— "Mental Diseases and Criminal Responsibility", State Hospitals Bulletin (1912–1913): 339–371.
- —— "Statistical Studies of the Insane", American Journal of Insanity 70 (Oct. 1913): 427–439.
- —— "Functions of the Hospital in Nervous and Mental Disorders", The Modern Treatment of Nervous and Mental Diseases 1 (1913): 811–854.
- —— "Uniform Statistical Reports on Insanity now Assured: An Official Classification of Psychoses", Journal of Nervous & Mental Disease 50 (1919): 42–50.
- —— "The Functions of the Psychopathic Hospital", American Journal of Insanity 76 (1919–1920): 21–34.
- —— "Pathology as Related to Psychiatry", State Hospitals Quarterly (1920–1921): 452–466.
- —— "Laws Controlling Commitments to State Hospitals for Mental Diseases", Mental Hygiene (1921): 536–544.
- —— Mental Diseases: A Public Health Problem. Boston, Badger, 1922. https://archive.org/details/39002065886047.med.yale.edu
- —— "The Importance of Psychiatry in the Practice of Medicine", The Boston Medical and Surgical Journal (1923): 965–969.
- —— "The Psychoses of the Period of Involution", Bulletin of the Massachusetts Department of Mental Diseases (1926–1927): 2–66.
- —— "The Dementia Praecoxschizophrenia Problem", American Journal of Psychiatry (1931): 401–446.
- —— "Presidential Address: The Establishment of Psychiatric Standards by the Association", American Journal of Psychiatry 90 (1933): 1–15.
