= Benjamin Mays =

American Baptist minister

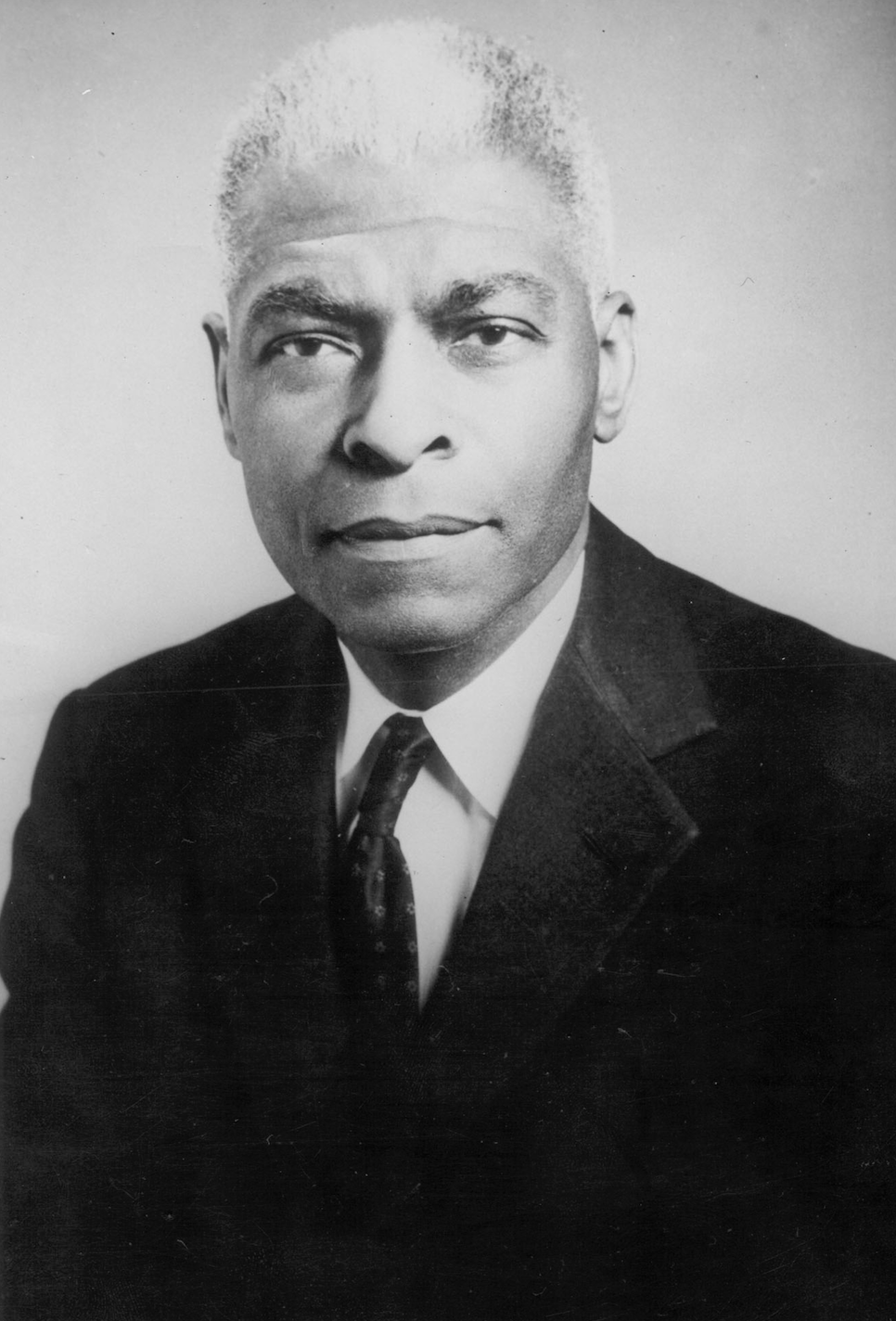
- Mays in 1921

6th President of Morehouse College
- In office August 1, 1940 – July 1, 1967
- Preceded by: Charles D. Hubert; As Acting President
- Succeeded by: Hugh Gloster

1st Dean of the School of Religion at Howard University
- In office January 1, 1934 – January 3, 1941
- Preceded by: Position established
- Succeeded by: John Moore

Personal details
- Born: Benjamin Elijah Mays; August 1, 1894 Ninety Six, South Carolina, U.S.
- Died: March 28, 1984 (aged 89) Atlanta, Georgia, U.S.
- Resting place: Dr. Benjamin E. Mays Memorial; Atlanta, Georgia, U.S.
- Party: Democratic
- Spouses: Ellen Harvin (m. 1920–1923) Sadie Gray (m. 1926–1969)
- Parent(s): Louvenia Carter Mays; Hezekiah Mays
- Education: Virginia Union University; Bates College; University of Chicago
- Known for: Civil rights activism
- Nickname(s): "Bennie"; "Buck Bennie"

Benjamin Elijah Mays (August 1, 1894 – March 28, 1984) was an American Baptist minister and civil rights leader who is credited with laying the intellectual foundations of the American civil rights movement. Mays taught and mentored many influential activists, including Martin Luther King Jr, Julian Bond, Maynard Jackson, and Donn Clendenon, among others. His rhetoric and intellectual pursuits focused on Black self-determination. Mays's commitment to social justice through nonviolence and civil resistance were cultivated from his youth through the lessons imbibed from his parents and eldest sister. The peak of his public influence coincided with his nearly three-decade tenure as the sixth president of Morehouse College, a historically black institution of higher learning, in Atlanta, Georgia.

Mays was born in the Jim Crow South on a repurposed cotton plantation to freed sharecroppers. He traveled North to attend Bates College and the University of Chicago from where he began his career in activism as a pastor in Georgia's Shiloh Baptist Church. After a brief career as a professor, he was appointed the founding Dean of the School of Religion at Howard University in 1934 which elevated him to national prominence as a proponent of the New Negro movement. Six years later, Mays was tapped to lead Morehouse out of its financial insecurity. Over his tenure from 1940 to 1967, the college's financial endowment doubled, enrollment quadrupled, and it became academically competitive. By the 1960s, Mays established the college as a feeder school for "African-American firsts" in the United States.

Due to the college's small student body, Mays personally mentored many students, most notably King; the two first met in 1944. King was known as Mays's "spiritual son" and Mays his "intellectual father". After King's "I Have A Dream" speech at the March on Washington for Jobs and Freedom in 1963, Mays gave the benediction. Five years later, upon King's assassination and death, Mays delivered the eulogy where he described King in his "No Man is Ahead of His Time" speech. Mays stepped down from the Morehouse presidency in 1967 continuing to work as a leader in the African American community through national social tours. He presided over the Atlanta Board of Education from 1969 to 1978, where he initiated the racial desegregation of Atlanta.

Mays's contributions to the civil rights movement have had him credited as the "movement's intellectual conscience" or alternatively the "Dean [or Schoolmaster] of the Movement". Historian Lawrence Carter described Mays as "one of the most significant figures in American history". Memorials include hundreds of streets, buildings, statues, awards, scholarships, grants, and fellowships named in his honor. Numerous efforts have been brought forward to posthumously award Mays the Presidential Medal of Freedom as well as feature him on a U.S. postage stamp. Mays has, since 1995, been entombed on the campus of Morehouse, with his wife, Sadie Gray, after an initial burial in Augusta.

== Early life ==
Benjamin Elijah Mays was born on August 1, 1894, in Epworth, South Carolina, in the small county of Greenwood, South Carolina, the youngest of eight children. His mother, Louvenia Carter Mays, and father, Hezekiah Mays, were born into slavery on Virginia and South Carolina plantations, respectively. Both were freed in their later lives with the passage of the 1863 Emancipation Proclamation. Mays's father often hit him, his siblings and Louvenia growing up, expressing anger about how he was treated by his master. The "Mays" family name was derived from their slaver and owner's name, Henry Hazel Mays; he owned 14 slaves in the same area. Hezekiah worked as a cotton sharecropper to generate income for his family.

Mays was told to be cautious of white people and exhibit black pride whenever possible growing up. Mays's older sister, Susie, began to teach him how to read before his formal schooling commenced, which gave him a year's growth in reading compared to the other students in his primary schools. School officials cited him as "destined for greatness". Growing up, he went by the nickname "Bennie" and was inspired by Frederick Douglass, Booker T. Washington, and Thomas E. Miller. The Bible was influential to young Mays because he could see his name (of Biblical origins) mentioned frequently, instilling a feeling of empowerment within. During this time, Benjamin Tillman rose to power in South Carolina which saw to the redoubling of lynching and segregation in Mays's neighborhood. Throughout his tenure as governor, 18 black men were lynched and dozens were hurt in the 1876 shoot-off. On November 8, 1898, members of the Phoenix Riot, a white supremacist mob, rode up on horses to the Mays household, a repurposed cotton plantation. They drew their guns on Mays's father and told him to remove his hat and bow down to them. The event would stay with Mays throughout his life. A year later, white mobs and Ku Klux Klan members searched his house in search of relatives after local newspapers announced that cotton prices had plummeted.

=== Early education ===
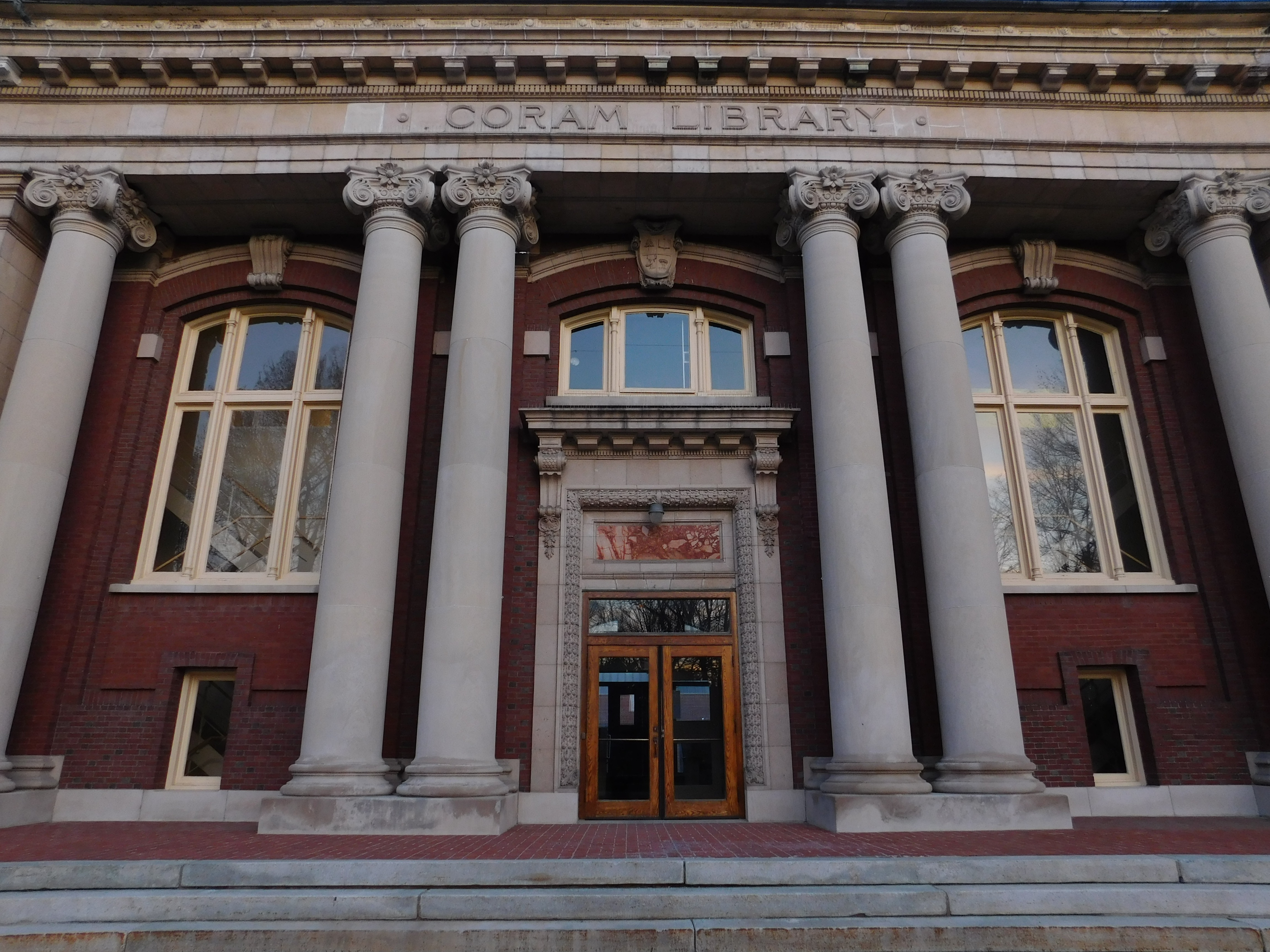
Mays traveled to Maine to study at Bates College when he was 23.

In 1911, he was enrolled at the Brick House School in Epworth, a Baptist-sponsored He also was enrolled in Bethany Industrial Graded School in McCormick, South Carolina founded by his church pastor Rev. James Foster Marshall. He then transferred to the High School Department of South Carolina State College in Orangeburg. He graduated in 1916, aged 22 as its valedictorian. In high school, teachers often let Mays instruct parts of the mathematics curriculum to students in exchange for extra credit. He won awards for debate and mathematics. A teacher at the school had told Mays to seek graduate school at the University of Chicago as he thought the school would best nurture Mays's intellect. However, before attending graduate school Mays needed to seek an undergraduate education. His relatives and teachers forced him to attend a Baptist university–the Virginia Union University. He grew weary of the violence against blacks in Virginia so he sought the guidance of his academic advisors at Virginia Union. They advised him to look into schools in the North as they were typically seen as more prestigious, challenging, and prominent than those of the South.

Four professors at the university had attended Bates College in Lewiston, Maine, and urged Mays to apply. However, its exacting standards prohibited him from attending. After a year more in Richmond, Mays elevated his grades to the top of his class and wrote personally to Bates president George Colby Chase. Chase granted him a full financial aid package and boarding upon hearing his story and reviewing his academic background. Virginia Union's president warned him that studies at Bates would be "too hard for a colored boy" and that he should stay in Virginia. Mays ignored his warnings and enrolled in 1917, aged 23. While at Bates he felt pressure to compete with "Yankees at the Yankee level" which drove him to dedicate him to his studies. He would write in a diary: "Yankee superiority was the gauntlet thrown down. I had to pick it up." Working to midnight weekly and arising at 4 AM, Mays excelled at Greek, mathematics, and speech. Although he would experience little racism in college, upon seeing The Birth of a Nation in a local cinema, the crowd cheered for the white slaver which frightened Mays. In college, he was captain of the debate team, played on the football team and served as the Class Day Speaker. He graduated with departmental honors with a B.A. in 1920. Contrary to popular writing and official college records, Mays never received Phi Beta Kappa; his attendance of a "high school school from the South" disqualified him.

=== Marriages ===
Shortly after graduation, he married his first wife, Ellen Edith Harvin, in August 1920 in Newport News, Virginia. The two met when Mays was still in South Carolina and wrote to each other frequently. She was a home economics teacher at a local college before she died after a brief illness two years after they married at age 28. He met his second wife, Sadie Gray, while working at South Carolina State College. After months of courtship, they married on August 9, 1926. Mays kept private the details of his relationship with his second wife; he burned the majority of letters and correspondence between them.

== Early academic career ==
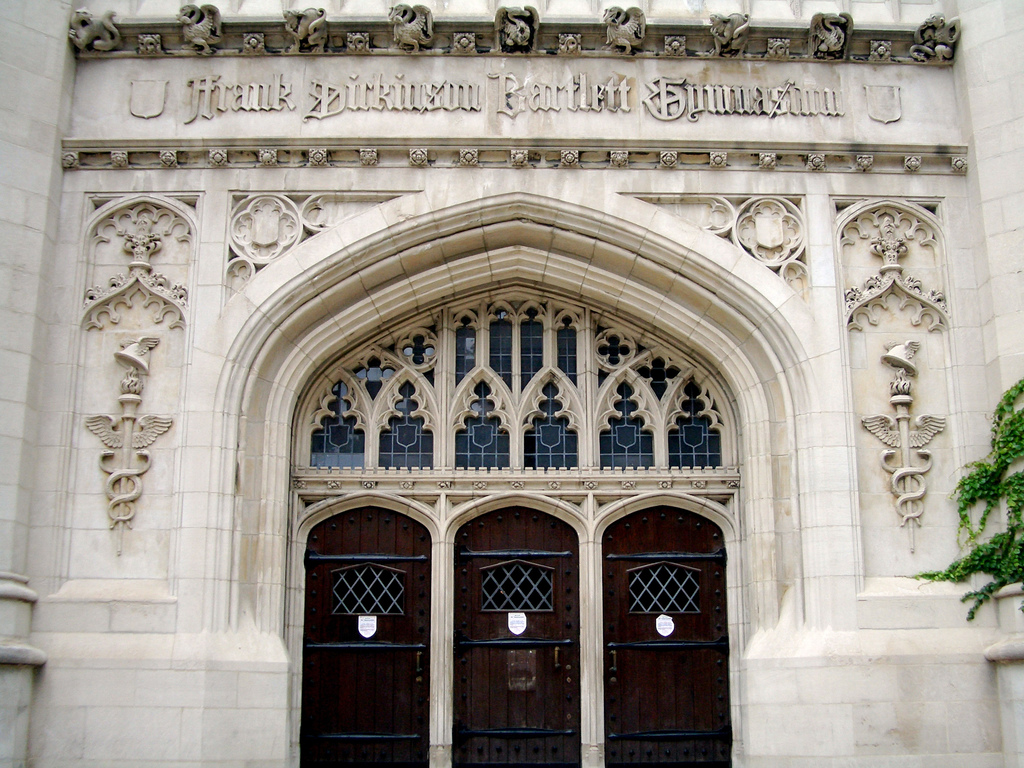
Mays studied at the University of Chicago after receiving his B.A. from Bates; he received a M.A. in 1925 and PhD. in 1935.

On January 3, 1921, he then entered the University of Chicago as a graduate student, earning an M.A. in 1925. Early on in his academic career he decided to join Omega Psi Phi, a national fraternity for colored men. This organization was known for pooling resources and information among its members so Mays viewed it with great interest. Mays viewed it as "a mountain top from which he could see above and beyond". In 1924, upon hearing news that there was to be a fraternity meeting in St. Louis, Missouri, Mays traveled by train. However, his decision to travel first class from Birmingham to St. Louis was indirectly against the Jim Crow laws. The ticket salesman only sold Mays a ticket when he lied about who it was for. While riding to St. Louis, the Pullman warned Mays that he was risking his life by sitting in first class and that he should get off at the next stop. Shortly after, three white men, guns drawn, escorted Mays into a car in the back known as the "Jim Crow car". He eventually made it to the Omega Psi Phi meeting, where he spoke of his experience.

To finance his time in university, Mays worked as a Pullman Porter, a railway assistant. Much of the money he had earned growing up was spent financing his time at Bates, on Christmas Day 1921, Mays held only 45 dollars (equivalent to $812 in 2025). Mays began labor organizing to increase his wage, which was seen negatively by the Porter managers. Although he legally established a labor group for Pullman Porters, he was fired from his job for "attracting too much attention to labor rights." His time at the University of Chicago was marked by segregation. He was asked to sit at the colored area in the dining halls and was only allowed to use certain rooms for reading. Mays tolerated the segregation with the mindset that he was "only there to get a degree, to convince another brilliant set of Yankees that he could do their work." Although he was licensed to preach in 1919, he was officially ordained a Baptist minister in 1921. During this time he encountered John Hope, the current president of Morehouse College. Hope spoke to Mays about the lack of "a fine education for the colored in Atlanta". Mays traveled to Atlanta in 1921 and served as a pastor at the Shiloh Baptist Church until 1923. In March 1925, Mays was award an M.A. in religious studies from the university. Upon receiving his master's degree, he wrote to the pastorate with his intention of resigning to pursue a doctorate in the coming years. However, due to his financial status, he took up a teaching position instructing English at South Carolina State College from 1925 to 1926. Mays left his teaching position after routinely clashing with other faculty over grade inflation and academic standards.

In 1926, he moved to Tampa, Florida, to serve as the director of the Tampa Urban League. While there, the Urban League produced what became known as the "Mays Report", which detailed the growth of Tampa's African-American communities and the difficulties they experienced living in segregated neighborhoods. Though he did not stay in the area for long, Mays made enough of an impact on the nascent push for civil rights in the region that he has been honored with a bust on the Tampa Riverwalk Historical Monument Trail. From 1928 to 1930, he lived in Atlanta and served as the national student secretary of the Young Men's Christian Association (YMCA). A couple of months later, he was asked to serve as the director of Study of Black Churches in the United States by the Institute of Social and Religious Research of New York. In 1932, Mays returned to the University of Chicago with the intent of completing a Ph.D. in line with what was asked by the Institute of Social and Religious Research of New York. After some deliberation between fields of studies he could pursue a doctorate in, he eventually decided to study religion and not mathematics or philosophy. Mays also worked as a student assistant to Dr. Lacey Kirk Williams, pastor of Olivet Baptist Church in Chicago and President of the National Baptist Convention. In 1933, he wrote his first book with Joseph Nicholson, The Negro's Church. It was the first sociological study of the black church in the United States and was submitted to the university faculty as his dissertation in 1935. Historian John Herbert Roper estimates that Mays was one of 20 African Americans to earn a doctorate during that year.

=== Howard University ===
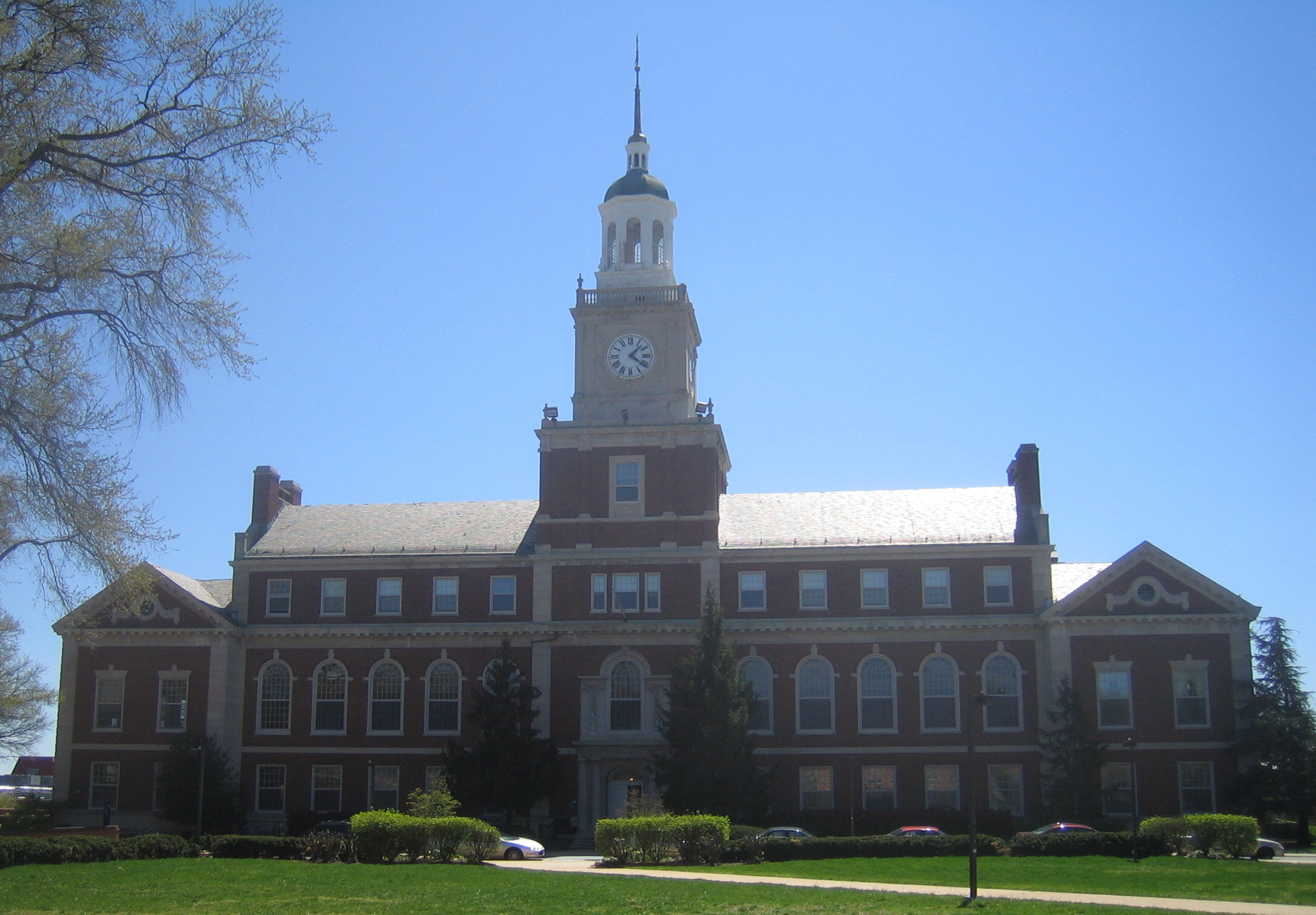
Mays worked at Howard University from 1934 to 1940.

Shortly after receiving his doctorate, he was called by the presidents of multiple universities to lead their religion departments. Mays chose to accept a position at Howard University in Washington as its dean of religious studies. He was instructed to build up the department and establish a reputation for well-trained ministers. Mays first renovated its library and secured loans from the federal government to expand it. His second objective was to separate the federally-funded portions of Howard University from the new school of religion. At the time, the university was partially funded by the U.S. Department of the Interior which prohibited funding to religious enterprises. After he successfully removed the School of Religion from the auspices of the federal government he was tasked with securing funding from wealthy donors from the North.

Mays secured a multi-million dollar package from donors by 1930, and was averaging yearly contributions of $750,000 during the Great Depression. The expanding Department of the Interior under Franklin D. Roosevelt, coupled with Mays's fundraising led to unprecedented growth at the university. Salaries for professors increased, new dorms were built and refurbished, the library Mays had been developing was completed, and new lecture halls were established. In 1938, he published his second book, The Negro's God as Reflected in His Literature. In 1939, he secured a large collection of theology books for his new library which prompted the American Association of Theological Schools to accredit the new School of Religion. During this time Mays developed a reputation for exacting standards and elitism. He was a vocal opponent of the notion that black men are inherently more violent than their white counterparts in universities. He was a vocal proponent of the New Negro movement and frequently lectured about its foundlings and applications.

In January 1940, Mays was secretly approached by John Hervey Wheeler, a trustee of Morehouse College, to see if he was interested in an upcoming search for the college's next president. Wheeler told Mays that the school had a tough time with getting tuition payments out of the students, growing their endowment, and establishing national prominence. Mays expressed interest in the position but Wheeler cautioned him about the odds of him actually being offered the job. On March 10, 1940, Mays was offered the presidency of Morehouse by its trustees; he moved to Atlanta shortly after. When Mays left Howard University, he was honored with the renaming of the newly constructed home of the divinity school to "Benjamin Mays Hall".

==== Meeting with Gandhi ====
In 1936–37, Mays traveled to Mysore, India, where, at the urging of Howard Thurman, a fellow professor at Howard, he spoke at some length with Mahatma Gandhi. The two spoke for an hour and a half about the realities and powers of militant pacifism which he used to shape his civil rights ideology and practice. Mays asked Gandhi about the influence nonviolence had in his life and what his personal thoughts were on the caste system in India. Gandhi told Mays that there was never an instance where violence was acceptable especially that which was undertaken in retaliation. He was told that "one must pay the price for protest, even with one's life". In response to the caste system. Gandhi believed that there those with darker skin were not inherently untouchable but labeled it a "necessary economic injustice".

== Morehouse College, 1940–1967 ==
=== Early years ===
Mays as the 6th president of Morehouse College.

Mays was offered the presidency on March 10 and inaugurated the sixth president on August 1, 1940. Upon his assumption of the presidency, the school was in severe financial distress. In his first speech to an incoming freshman class in 1940, he said, "If Morehouse is to continue to be great; it must continue to produce outstanding personalities." Mays set out to improve the training of Morehouse men, increase enrollment, grow its endowment, and collect tuition payments.

Many associated with the college referenced him as a "builder of men". To improve the training of Morehouse men, Mays set out to advance a new curriculum based on the New Negro movement. He specifically wished to increase the training of black physicians, ministers and lawyers. Although Morehouse College was not a medical, law, or ministry school, it was a feeder institution into them so Mays took the preparation of his students into these schools seriously.

=== Financial planning ===
During his first three months nothing was planned to be or currently being constructed on campus. Mays had inherited "mountains of uncollected student bills" which served as a threat to the liquidity of the college. In 1933, Morehouse was doing so poorly financially that it had allowed Atlanta University to take over its financial direction and budget. He earned a reputation for being a penny-pincher and demanded tuition fees on time, which earned him the nickname "Buck Bennie;" the student newspaper occasionally ran headlines such as "Buck Bennie Rides Again", during the first couple of years of his Morehouse presidency. However, he often helped students pay their bills by offering work or finding it around campus. He would write to the employers of the college's graduates to ask them how the recent grads were doing as a way to measure the Morehouse education. Within two years of his presidency, Mays was so successful that he was able to regain control of Morehouse's finances.

=== Effects of World War II ===
Soon after primary advancements were made with the college, World War II broke out and many students were drafted for military service. The chairman of the Board of Trustees of Morehouse approached Mays and requested the school be shut down for the remainder of the war, which prompted Mays to lash out and reject his proposition publicly. Mays counter-proposal was to open the school to younger students who were ineligible to be drafted. He moved to improve the academic quality of the students by lowering admissions rates, and reforming the academic platform. College faculty were often encouraged to befriend students and provided them with guidance in a tumultuous social scene at the time.

=== Recognition ===
The introduction to his speech compilation at Morehouse notes him with the following:

In physical stature Mays stood six feet tall, but appeared taller because of his erect posture--a habit he developed during his youth to walk around with dignity and pride; he weighed approximately 180 pounds and had a full head of iron-grey air with a contrasting dark complexion. His distinctive physical appearance commented his towering intellectual stature. When Mays walked into a room, eyes were likely to focus in his direction. His mere physical presence attracted attention.

He received an honorary doctorate and the "Alumnus of the Year" Award from Bates College in 1947 and the University of Chicago in 1949, respectively. Although he was a college president, he was not allowed to vote in the 1950s until he was 52 years old. Pulpit, a magazine focusing on black religious preachers, ranked him among the top 20 preachers in America in 1954. The same year he was one of the "Top Ten Most Powerful Negros" in the nation according to black magazine, Our World.

=== Jackie Robinson ===
In 1966, as president, Mays was invited to sit at an Atlanta Braves baseball game as a guest-of-honor by Jackie Robinson when the sports franchise moved from Milwaukee to Atlanta. Robinson invited Mays because of his efforts to integrate the baseball team in Atlanta. Robinson said of Mays: "When we first moved here it was the first team of major league caliber to ever move this far south to play baseball. And of course [Mays] was one of the guys, one of the persons really that made things a lot easier for myself and some of the other black ball players."

=== Roles in the White House ===
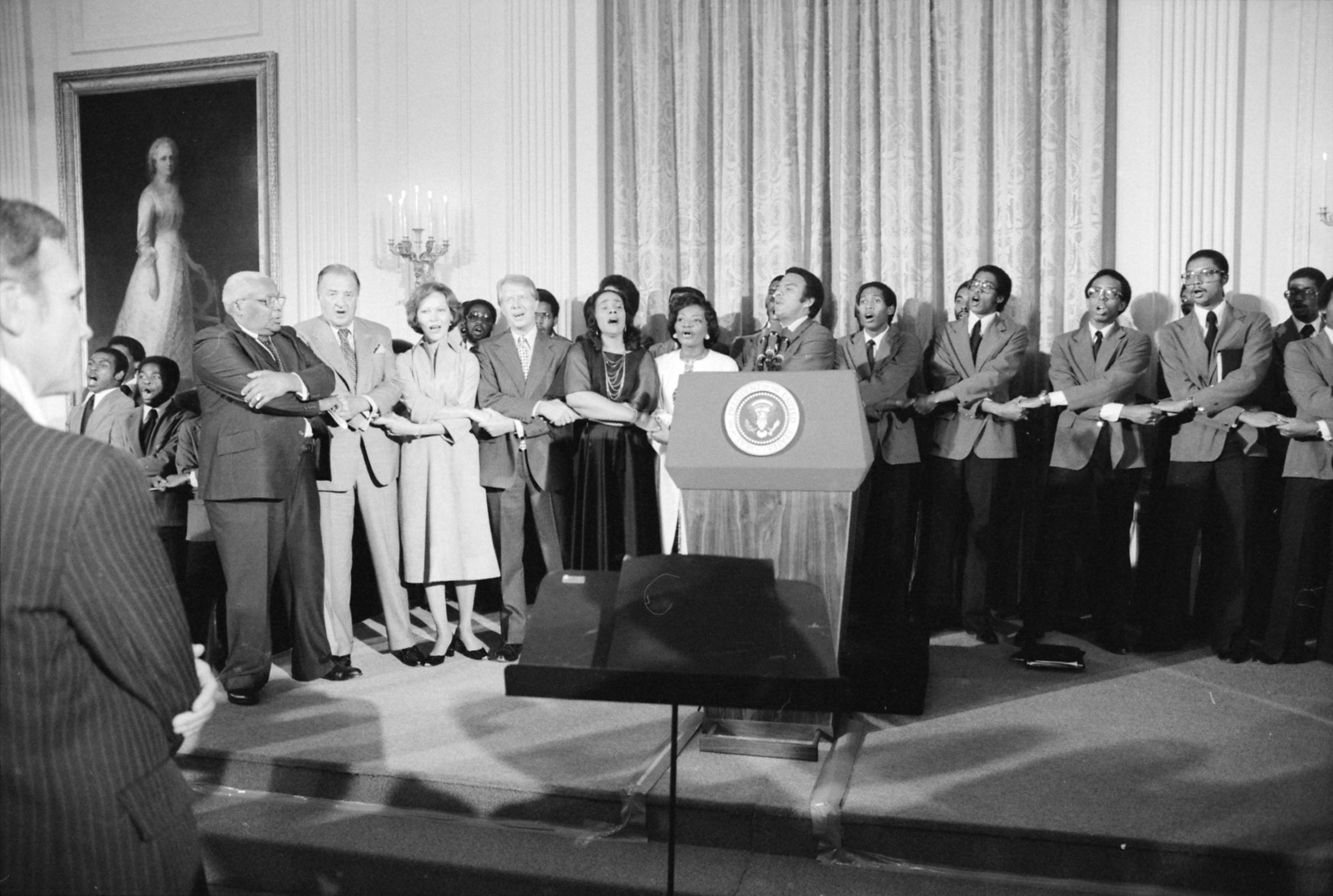
Jimmy Carter, with Coretta Scott King, Martin Luther King, Sr, and Mays

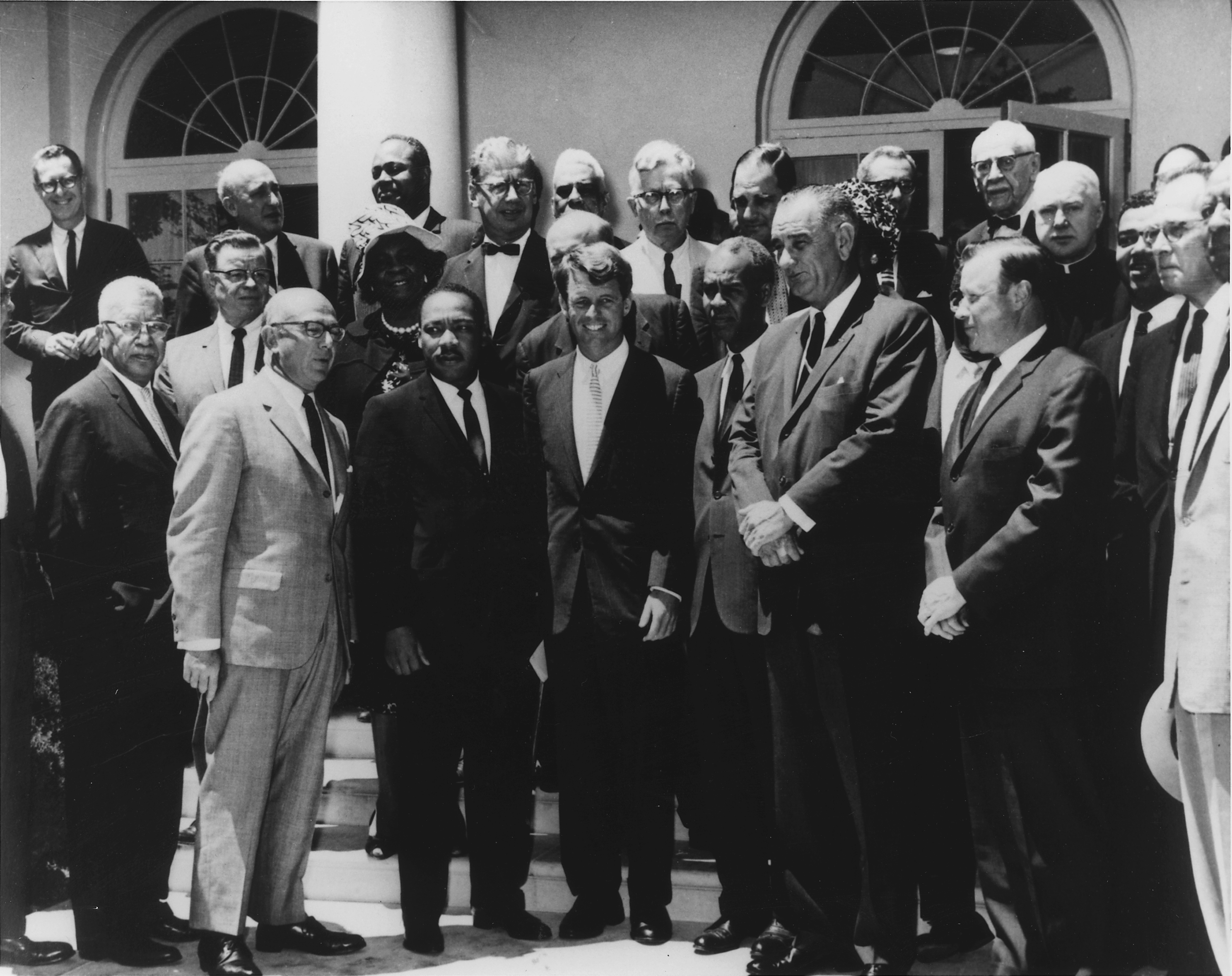
Mays (right of Robert F. Kennedy) at the White House

As president he was in great demand as a public speaker. He met hundreds of national and international leaders and served as a trusted advisor to Presidents Kennedy, Johnson, and Carter. He was appointed by President Truman to the Mid-Century White House Conference on Children and Youth. When Pope John XXIII died in 1963, President Kennedy sent Mays and his vice president to represent the United States at the funeral in Rome, Italy. During the Kennedy administration, southern members of the Senate blocked Mays's appointment to the United States Civil Rights Commission by accusing him of being a Communist. Mays denied the charges. His relationship with President Jimmy Carter was marked with "warmth" and "hospitality". Carter visited Mays's home in Atlanta, and Mays in turn campaigned for Carter during his 1976 and 1980 presidential runs. Carter wrote to Mays on a monthly basis during his presidency asking him about "human rights, international affairs, and discrimination."

=== Final years ===
Mays wanted to hire more teachers, and to pay those teachers a better salary. To do that, Mays sought to be more strict in the collection of student fees, and wanted to increase Morehouse's endowment from $1,114,000. He more than quadrupled the endowment that he inherited by the end of his 27-year tenure. Over Mays's twenty-seven years leading Morehouse, the enrollment increased 169%, from 238 to almost a thousand students and furthered the motivation for graduates to pursue graduate studies.

== Connection to Martin Luther King Jr. ==
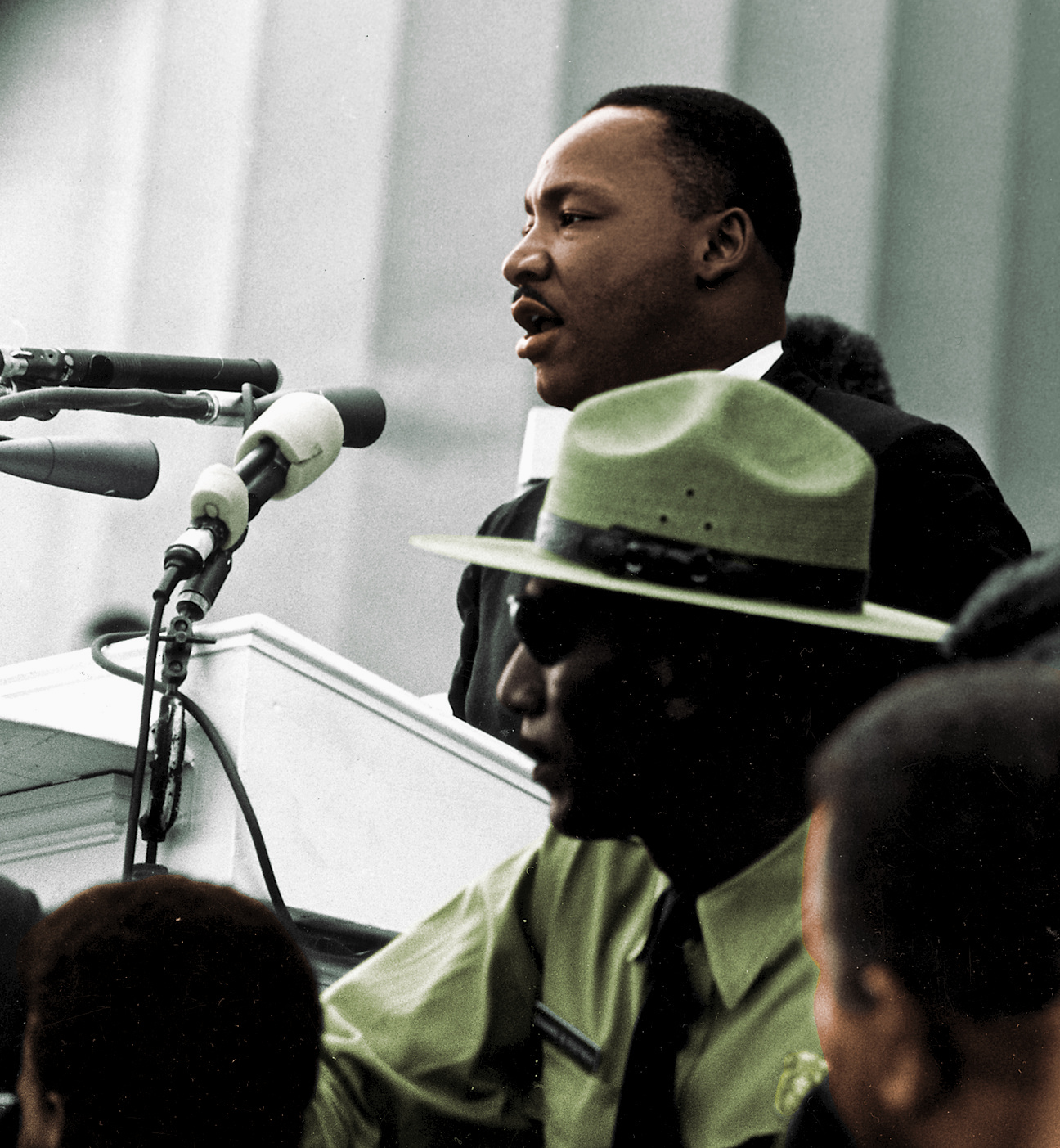
Martin Luther King Jr. considered Mays his "spiritual father".

Mays first became associated with Martin Luther King Jr. during his time as a student at Morehouse College. While King was a student from 1944 to 1948 he often went to Morehouse's chapel to hear Mays preach. After the sermons, King would run up to Mays and engage with him about the ideas he presented often following him into his office, hours after the sermon ended. He was also a friend of Martin Luther King Jr.'s father, Martin Luther King Sr. and often participated with him in religious organizations in Atlanta. Mays dined at the King's homes from time to time and spoke with the young Martin Luther King Jr. about his career prospects and ambitions. His mother, Alberta Williams King said Mays was a "great influence on Martin Luther King Jr.," "[an] example of what kind of minister Martin could become," and "possessor of great moral principles".

While King was only in his 20s, Mays helped him assume the responsibility of his actions in the civil rights rallies in which he participated. King needed Mays "for spiritual support as he faced the burden of being perceived as the personification of black America's hopes and dreams, it was Mays who held the job as King's consigliere over the next fourteen years as the death threats against him grew more ominous and the public battles more dangerous."

After King gained national attention as a consequence of his 1955 Montgomery bus boycott, he began to refer to Mays as his "spiritual and intellectual mentor", which enhanced the friendship they had and prompted Mays to be more involved with King's civil rights endeavors. Mays revered him as his "spiritual son". Mays gave the benediction at the close of the official program of the March on Washington for Jobs and Freedom, where King delivered his "I Have a Dream" speech in 1963.

=== "No man is ahead of his time" speech ===
External audio
- No Man Is Ahead of His Time - Dr. Benjamin E. Mays delivers Dr. King's Eulogy Mount Zion Progressive Missionary Baptist Church, April 9, 1968

The two developed a close relationship that continued until King's assassination by James Earl Ray on April 4, 1968. King and Mays promised each other that whoever outlived the other would deliver the eulogy at the other's funeral.

On April 9, 1968, Mays delivered a eulogy that would later be known as the "No Man is Ahead of His Time" speech. He noted King's time in history to an estimated 150,000 mourners by stating in his most famous passage:

If Jesus was called to preach the Gospel to the poor, Martin Luther was called to give dignity to the common man. If a prophet is one who interprets in clear and intelligible language the will of God, Martin Luther King Jr. fits that designation. If a prophet is one who does not seek popular causes to espouse, but rather the causes he thinks are right, Martin Luther qualified on that score. No! He was not ahead of his time. No man is ahead of his time. Every man is within his star, each in his time. Each man must respond to the call of God in his lifetime and not in somebody else's time. Jesus had to respond to the call of God in the first century A.D., and not in the 20th century. He had but one life to live. He couldn't wait.

The speech was well received by the attendants of the funeral and the American public. It was later hailed as "a masterpiece of twentieth century oratory". After the death of King, Mays drew controversy when his sermon at the Ebenezer Baptist Church urged an audience of mostly white people "not to dishonor [King's] name by trying to solve our problems through rioting in the streets. If they could turn their sorrow into hope for the future and use their outrage to invigorate a peaceful climb to the mountaintop, Martin Luther King Jr. will have died a redemptive death from which all mankind will benefit."

== After Morehouse, 1967–1981 ==
=== Social tours and advocacy ===
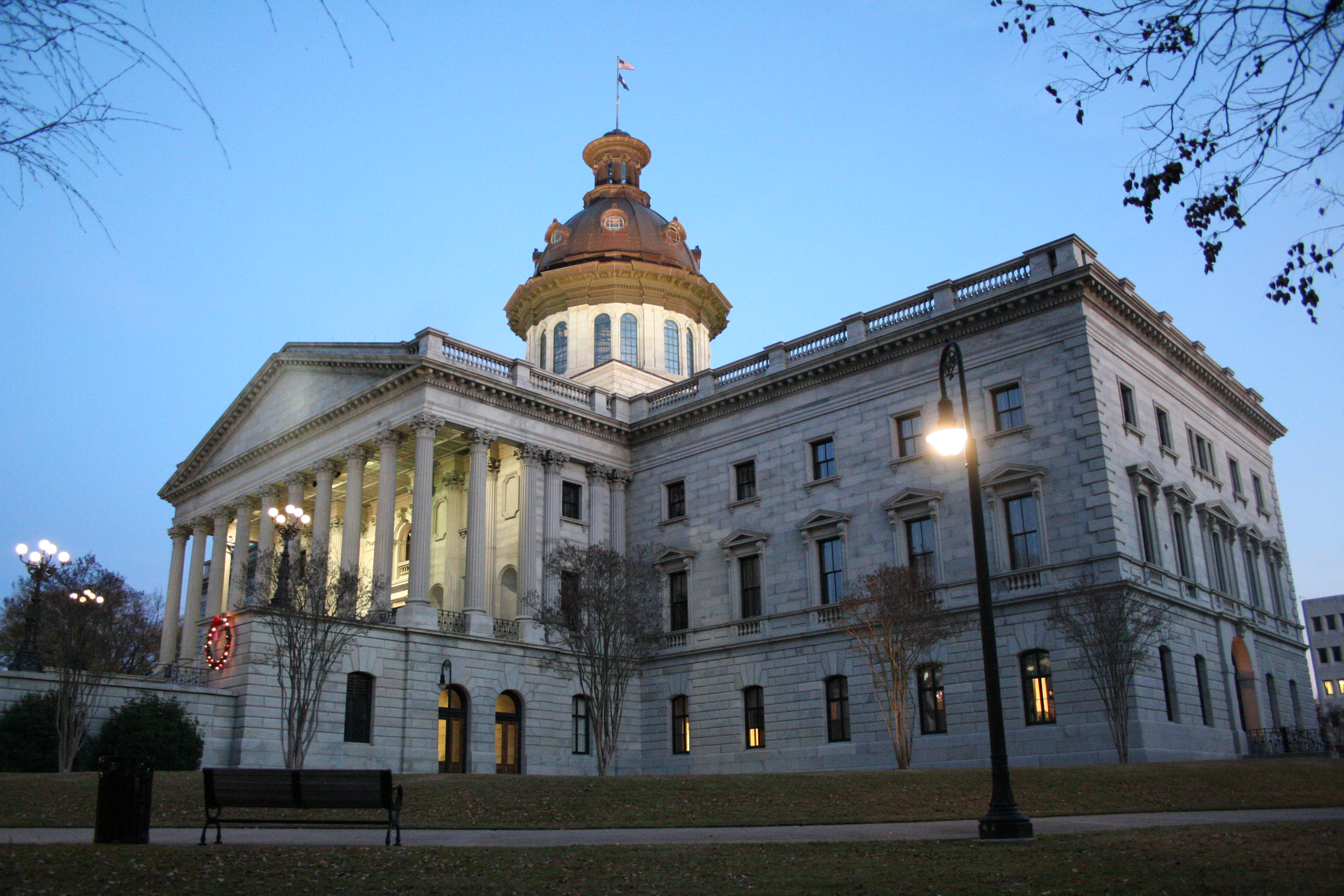
Mays, during his social tours, was honored at the South Carolina State House in 1978.

Mays began teaching again, and served as a private advisor to the president of Michigan State University and went on to publish Disturbed About Man, a collection of his sermons at Morehouse College. His publications described his early life in South Carolina and the racial tensions he had to overcome. During this time he began to give speeches and commencement addresses at various institutions to spread both religious and racial tolerance. He ended his social tours in the early 1980s, giving a total of 250 commencement addresses at colleges, universities, and schools. In 1978, the U.S. Department of Education granted him the Distinguished Educator Award and the South Carolina State House hung a commissioned portrait of him in its chamber. These awards from South Carolina were deeply appreciated by Mays as he left the state in fear of his life and this he loved. During the social transformation of the South in the 1970s, Mays's legacy in his birthplace was solidified and he took on the title of "native son".

=== Atlanta board presidency ===
At age seventy-five, Mays was elected president of the Atlanta Public Schools Board of Education, where he supervised the peaceful desegregation of Atlanta's public schools as a consequence of the 1970 federal court order. Members of the board argued that since the bussing was not a part of their system they did not have to create one for desegregation; however, the idea was shot down by Mays, who cited the Swann v. Charlotte-Mecklenburg Board of Education Supreme Court decision. It was during this time that Mays ordered the city to create bus routes to cater to African-American neighborhoods. The board did not support the decision and asked Georgia's Attorney General, Arthur K. Bolton, for a review of the case. Bolton brought the city government together with the board and with Mays created what was known as the Atlanta Compromise Plan.

His "commanding and demanding personality" was largely credited for the exponential levels of desegregation in Atlanta. The Atlanta Compromise Plan prompted Mays to advocate for the administration of the plan to be "colorless", that is to say, black and white students were transported on the same routes, in the same buses. This was named the "Majority to Minority" volunteer plan, better known as the "M to M" plan. The plan also allowed each student whose race was in the majority at a school to transfer to a school where they would be in the minority race; this was advantageous to the black populace of Atlanta. The program was later known as the "Volunteer Transfer Program" or VTP, and was ministered by the federal courts and the board. On July 28, 1974, Mays signed the alignment order declaring that the Atlanta School System was unitary.

On July 1, 1973, Mays appointed Alonzo Crim as the first African-American superintendent of schools, which was met with backlash from the other board members and city officials. He used his power and influence in Atlanta to shield Crim from the criticism and allowed him the opportunity to run the school system. During the later part of his tenure he greatly expanded the jurisdiction of the board, and upon his retirement in 1981 Mays was honored by the naming of a street. Near the end of his tenure, the board voted to name a newly constructed school after Mays; Mays High School was constructed on February 10, 1985, and was open to students of all races. He retired from the board in 1981. The Atlanta Board of Education had a rule against naming buildings after people unless they had been deceased for two years; they waived it for Mays; he visited the school frequently when it was being built. He is widely credited as the most influential figure in the desegregation of Atlanta, Georgia.

== Death and legacy ==
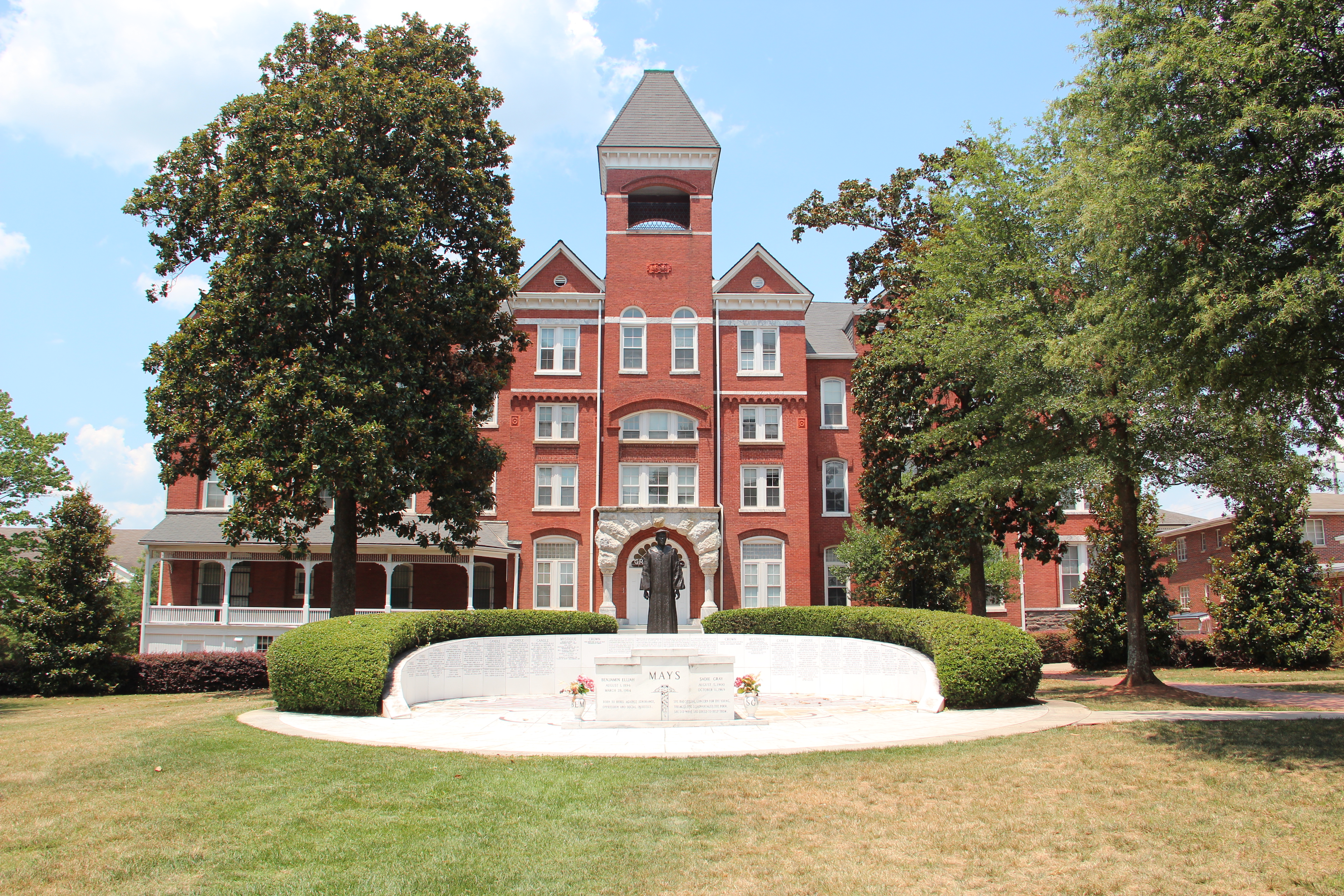
A statue of Mays sits feet away from his memorial on the grounds of Morehouse College.

Benjamin Mays died on March 28, 1984, in Atlanta, Georgia. He was initially buried at South-View Cemetery, but in May 1995 his body was entombed on the campus of Morehouse College along with his wife Sadie. Morehouse College established the Benjamin E. Mays Scholarship shortly after his death.

Boston University professor Lawrence Carter described Mays as "one of the most significant figures in American history." Andrew Young said of Mays: "if there hadn't of been [sic] a Benjamin Mays there would not have been a Martin Luther King Jr. He was very much a product of Dr. Mays religious thinking." He was known to Dillard University president Samuel DuBois Cook as "[one of the] great architects of the civil rights movement. Not only in training individuals but in writing his books, leadership in churches, as a pastor, college president. He set the standard. And he was uncompromising." In 2002, scholar Molefi Kete Asante listed Benjamin Mays on his list of 100 Greatest African Americans.

=== Sites and honors ===
In his home state of South Carolina a portrait of Mays, painted by artist Larry Francis Lebby, was placed in the gallery of the South Carolina House chambers in 1981. Mays was inducted into the South Carolina Hall of Fame in 1984. His childhood home was relocated from Epworth to Greenwood, SC and is listed as a State Historic Site by the government of South Carolina, being referred to as an "education icon" by the South Carolina Radio Network in 2011. Upon his death Mays was designated Phi Beta Kappa, Delta Sigma Rho, Delta Theta Chi, Omega Psi Phi.

Nationally, he was awarded the Spingarn Medal from the National Association for the Advancement of Colored People in 1982. He was elected to the Schomburg Honor Roll of Race Relations along with "only a dozen major leaders to be so honored." In 2011, Williams College in Williamstown, Massachusetts, introduced the Mellon Mays Undergraduate Fellowship at Williams College. The National School Boards Association created the Benjamin Elijah Mays Lifetime Achievement Award for "an individual who—during his or her lifetime—has demonstrated a longstanding commitment to the educational needs of urban school children through his or her service as a local school board member." Due to his stature in academia he was frequently awarded honorary degrees from universities. He was awarded 40 of them during his lifetime and as of February 2018, he has received 56 honorary degrees.

Bates College's highest alumni distinction is known as the Benjamin E. Mays Medal and is reserved for "the alumna or alumnus who has performed distinguished service to the larger (worldwide) community and been deemed a graduate of outstanding accomplishment." The inaugural winner was Mays himself. The college established the Benjamin E. Mays Distinguished Professorship in 1985.

Mays has been the subject or inspiration of memorials, and the eponym of hundreds of buildings, schools, streets, halls, awards, grants, scholarships, fellowships, and statues. Although he through his life had been appreciative of all of them, he "[was] reported to have said he was moved most deeply when a small black church in Ninety Six, South Carolina, renamed itself Mays United Methodist Church. There are numerous memorials to Mays in the United States, including:

- Benjamin Elijah Mays High School, in Atlanta, Georgia, U.S.
- Benjamin E. Mays Drive in Atlanta, Georgia, U.S.
- Benjamin E. Mays Archives in Atlanta, Georgia, U.S.
- Benjamin E. Mays National Memorial in Atlanta, Georgia, U.S.
- The Statue of Benjamin E. Mays at Morehouse College, Atlanta, Georgia, U.S.
- Benjamin Mays Hall of Howard University, in Washington, D.C., U.S.
- Benjamin Mays Center of Bates College, in Lewiston, Maine, U.S.
- Benjamin E. Mays International Magnet School, in St. Paul, Minnesota, U.S.
- Mays House Museum, in Greenwood, South Carolina, U.S.
- Benjamin Mays Historic Site, in Greenwood, South Carolina, U.S.
- Dr Benjamin E. Mays Elementary School in Greenwood, South Carolina, U.S.
- Mays United Methodist Church, in Ninety Six, South Carolina, U.S.
- Mays Crossroads on Highway 171 in Ninety Six, South Carolina, U.S.
- Benjamin E. Mays Elementary Academy, in Chicago, Illinois, U.S.
- Benjamin E. Mays High School in Pacolet, South Carolina, U.S.

=== Medal of Freedom effort ===
After Mays stepped down from the Atlanta Board of Education presidency in 1981, a petition was sent to the desk of U.S. President Ronald Reagan requesting that Mays be given the Presidential Medal of Freedom, but it was turned down. Georgian representative John Lewis proposed a bill in January 1993 that would commemorate Mays on a federal stamp and requested that Mays be given the Medal of Freedom posthumously. The request was sent to U.S. President Bill Clinton but his time as president ended before he could address the request. A request was sent once again to U.S. President George W. Bush by Georgian representatives Max Cleland and Zell Miller which passed both houses of Congress but has yet to be signed by a U.S. president. The petition was sent once more in 2012 to U.S. President Barack Obama, yet failed to be awarded.

== See also ==
- List of peace activists
- List of civil rights leaders
- List of Bates College people
- List of University of Chicago people
- Post–civil rights era in African-American history
