= Whitecorn, Missouri =

Unincorporated community in Missouri, U.S.

Coordinates: 38°53′53″N 90°21′27″W

Whitecorn is an unincorporated community in St. Charles County, in the U.S. state of Missouri.

The community most likely was so named on account of the local white corn crop.
