= Carol Jean Mays =

American politician (1933–2021)

Carol Jean Mays (July 16, 1933 - December 15, 2021) was an American Democratic politician from Independence, Missouri, who served in the Missouri House of Representatives.

Born in Independence, Missouri, she attended the public schools of Kansas City, Missouri, and Baker University, a private university in Baldwin City, Kansas. She was a restaurant owner in Independence, Missouri.
