= William Edward Mayes =

English painter

William Edward Mayes (1861 – April 12, 1952) was an English painter from Great Yarmouth, Norfolk.

His father was Master Mariner Captain John Mayes. He managed the Yarmouth Iron Works Foundry Co. Ltd. for over 20 years.

He was a founding member of the "Yarmouth and Gorleston Art Society" in 1937. later known as the "Great Yarmouth and District Society of Artists." He attended the first meeting with C.A. Mellon as chairman.

His primary medium was watercolour and most of his paintings are representational landscapes of Norfolk, particularly the Norfolk Broads, in the style of fellow Broadlands painter Stephen John Batchelder.

He died aged 91.
