= Jimmy Mays =

American scientist and author

Jimmy W. Mays
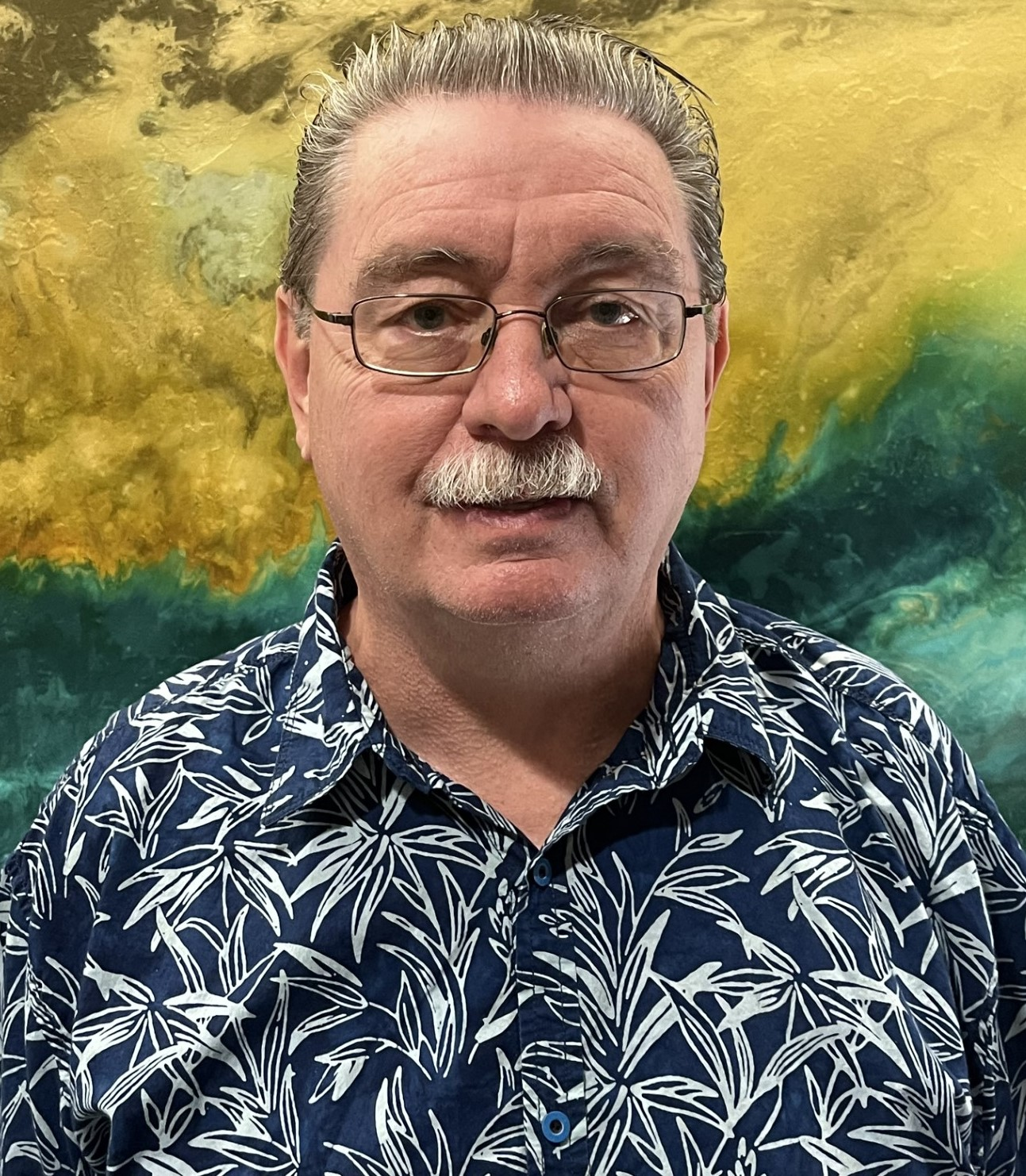
- Born: United States
- Occupations: Polymer scientist, academic and author

Academic background
- Education: B.S., in polymer science Ph.D
- Alma mater: University of Southern Mississippi; University of Akron

Jimmy W. Mays is an American polymer scientist, academic, and author. He is a Professor Emeritus at the University of Tennessee.

Mays is most known for his works on polymer chemistry, block copolymers, and composite materials. Among his authored works are his books such as Modern Methods of Polymer Characterization and Molecular Characterization of Polymers.

Mays is the recipient of the 2009 Southern Chemist Award from the American Chemical Society (ACS); and a Fellow of ACS, the Royal Society of Chemistry, and the American Association for the Advancement of Science. He is the Associate Editor Emeritus of the International Journal of Polymer Analysis and Characterization.

== Education ==
Mays completed his Bachelor of Science in Polymer Science from the University of Southern Mississippi in 1979. Later in 1984, he obtained a Ph.D in Polymer Science from the University of Akron.

== Career ==
Mays began his academic career in 1988 at the University of Alabama at Birmingham where he held various positions, including serving as an assistant professor from 1988 to 1992, Associate Professor from 1992 to 1995, and professor from 1995 to 2001. In 2002, he moved to the University of Tennessee, where he was appointed as a Distinguished Professor of Chemistry from 2002 to 2017 and held a concurrent appointment as a professor at the UT Institute of Biomedical Engineering from 2013 to 2017. Since 2018, he has been holding an appointment as a professor emeritus at the University of Tennessee (UT).

Mays co-founded Smart Surfaces and worked as a Partner there from 2000 to 2017. During this period, he concurrently held several appointments, including roles as a Distinguished Scientist at the Oak Ridge National Laboratory from 2002 to 2017, Principal Technical Advisor at Fuji Film Hunt Smart Surfaces from 2005 to 2008, and President at BBB elastomers from 2010 to 2015.

== Research ==
Mays' polymer chemistry research has won him the 2014 Fellowship from the Royal Society of Chemistry. He holds patents to several projects, including Energy absorbing nanocomposite materials and methods thereof and Multigraft copolymers as superelastomers. He has authored numerous publications spanning the areas of nanotechnology, polymer science, and composite materials including books, book chapters, and articles in peer-reviewed journals.

=== Nanocomposites ===
Mays' nanocomposite research has provided insights into the intricacies of surface chemistry pertaining to the process of attaching polymer chains onto nanoparticles and surfaces with nanostructured features. He synthesized and analyzed clay nanoparticle-infused nanocomposites using techniques like dielectric relaxation spectroscopy and dynamic mechanical spectroscopy, revealing the effects of factors such as clay amount, polyisoprene molecular weight, and relaxation processes on material properties. In his investigation of how nanoparticle size and shape influence the structure and surface segregation of polymer nanocomposite thin films, he used a bilayer system of deuterated and protonated polystyrene to track structural changes during thermal annealing and demonstrated that nanoparticles impede polymer interdiffusion in thin films regardless of their shape, size, or rigidity. His examination of nanoparticle rigidity on diffusion established that incorporating flexible nanoparticles into a polymer matrix enhances the diffusion coefficient of the linear polymer chain while introducing rigid C60 nanoparticles leads to a twofold increase in the diffusion coefficient of the polystyrene chain during the available annealing time range. In collaborative research with Shiwang Cheng and others, he studied polymer nanocomposite (PNC) interfacial properties by revealing a reduction in interfacial layer thickness with increased molecular weight, linked to hindered segmental relaxation.

Mays' nanocomposite research has introduced an approach to crafting composite materials tailored for the efficient absorption and dispersion of high-energy forces, including ballistic impacts and explosive blasts. His examination of the interfacial properties of polymer nanocomposites explored the influence of molecular parameters on interfacial layer structure and dynamics and established that the interfacial layer thickness increases with greater polymer chain rigidity. Moreover, his collaborative work with Gajanan Bhat and others has suggested that surface-functionalized CNFs, when properly dispersed and aligned within the PAN matrix through appropriate processing techniques, can significantly enhance the mechanical properties of PAN-based composite filaments, potentially leading to the production of improved CNF-reinforced carbon fibers.

=== Elastomers ===
Mays' elastomer research has focused on the synthesis, tensile characteristics and morphological attributes of tetra-functional multigraft copolymers. His early research has provided insights into the synthesis and characterization of polybenzofulvene and polyisoprene and developed a new class of thermoplastic elastomers based on polybenzofulvene and polyisoprene through precise anionic polymerization techniques. In related research, he presented the synthesis and characterization of a novel group of high-temperature thermoplastic elastomers, created through living anionic polymerization of polybenzofulvene–polyisoprene–polybenzofulvene (FIF) triblock copolymers in room temperature benzene. In collaboration with Samuel P Gido, Roland Weidisch and others, he developed thermoplastic elastomer compositions using multigraft copolymers which exhibited desirable properties such as high tensile strength, high strain at break, and low residual strain after elongation. Furthermore, he conducted comprehensive research on superelastomers, and introduced a new class of all-acrylic superelastomers with important mechanical properties and a simple synthesis approach. Additionally, he developed urea functionalized poly(dimethyl siloxane)-based elastomers (U-PDMS-Es), a synthetic polymer with attributes such as high stretchability, self-healing mechanics, and recoverable gas-separation proficiency, with significant multi-faceted application potential including self-healing, mechanical robustness, and gas-separation capabilities. Moreover, his investigation of the TPEs and their use in various applications, such as adhesives, elastomers, coatings, fibers, and 3D printing proposed the incorporation of supramolecular interactions into different macromolecular architectures as a means to extend the range of TPE applications.

=== Biomaterials ===
Mays' biomaterial research has contributed to the development of polymer-based biomaterials with properties for specific biomedical applications. In a collaborative study with Dong Xie and others, he examined the possible cytotoxic effects of residual 2-hydroxyethyl methacrylate (HEMA) in existing resin-modified glass ionomer cements (RMGICs) and suggested the employment of innovative amino acid derivatives as a substitute for HEMA in RMGICs to eradicate potential cytotoxicity while enhancing mechanical robustness. In related research, he presented a biotechnological approach for surface modification of porcine islets using specialized PEG derivatives, resulting in noteworthy in vitro and in vivo cytoprotective effects against cytotoxicity induced by human serum and in diabetic SCID mice, respectively, on the porcine islets. Concentrating his research efforts on bifunctional oligomers, his study suggested that novel bifunctional oligomers, when used in the formulation of compomers, can lead to improved mechanical properties, particularly higher compressive strength, tensile strength, and flexural strength, compared to existing commercial products. More recently in 2015, he conducted an investigation on commercial polypropylene pelvic mesh products, focusing on their chemical composition, molecular weight characteristics, and changes pre- and post-implantation, revealing in vivo oxidative degradation of polypropylene, leading to reduced molecular weight and a narrower polydispersity index.

== Awards and honors ==
- 2003 – Arthur K. Doolittle Award, American Chemical Society
- 2008 – Distinguished Service Award, ACS Division of Polymer Chemistry
- 2009 – Southern Chemist Award, American Chemical Society
- 2011 – Fellow, American Chemical Society
- 2012 – Fellow, American Association for the Advancement of Science
- 2014 – Fellow, Royal Society of Chemistry
- 2017 – Lifetime Achievement Award, Tosoh Bioscience

== Bibliography ==
=== Books ===
- Modern Methods of Polymer Characterization (1991) ISBN 9780471828143
- Molecular Characterization of Polymers (2021) ISBN 9780128197684

=== Selected articles ===
- Liang, C., Hong, K., Guiochon, G. A., Mays, J. W., & Dai, S. (2004). Synthesis of a large‐scale highly ordered porous carbon film by self‐assembly of block copolymers. Angewandte Chemie International Edition, 43(43), 5785–5789.
- Baskaran, D., Mays, J. W., & Bratcher, M. S. (2004). Polymer‐grafted multiwalled carbon nanotubes through surface‐initiated polymerization. Angewandte Chemie International Edition, 43(16), 2138–2142.
- Baskaran, D., Mays, J. W., & Bratcher, M. S. (2005). Noncovalent and nonspecific molecular interactions of polymers with multiwalled carbon nanotubes. Chemistry of Materials, 17(13), 3389–3397.
- Hadjichristidis, N., Iatrou, H., Pitsikalis, M., & Mays, J. (2006). Macromolecular architectures by living and controlled/living polymerizations. Progress in Polymer Science, 31(12), 1068–1132.
- Baskaran, D., Mays, J. W., Zhang, X. P., & Bratcher, M. S. (2005). Carbon nanotubes with covalently linked porphyrin antennae: photoinduced electron transfer. Journal of the American Chemical Society, 127(19), 6916–6917.
