= James P. Mays =

American 19th century politician

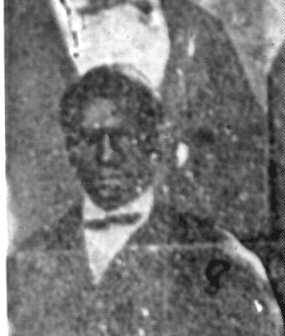

South Carolina House of Representatives
- In office 1868–1872

Personal details
- Party: Republican
- Spouse: Isabella

James P. Mays was Commissioner of Elections in Orangeburg County, South Carolina, and in the South Carolina House of Representatives during the Reconstruction era in 1868. He was also appointed Coroner in 1873.

== History ==
In 1872, Mays alleged election tampering in a statement he made as a Commissioner of Elections for Orangeburg.

After 1885, he and his wife Isabella moved to Chattanooga, Tennessee.
