= Maze (disambiguation) =

A maze is a type of puzzle that consists of a complex branching passage through which the solver must find a route.

Maze, The Maze or Mazes may also refer to:

== Places ==
- Maze (HM Prison), a former prison in Northern Ireland
- Maze, County Down, an electoral ward and townland in Northern Ireland
- MacArthur Maze, a freeway interchange in Oakland, California
- Maże, Poland
- Masi, Norway, also known as Máze, a Sami community in Norway
- Maze, Pennsylvania, unincorporated community
- Mazes, a townland in County Antrim, Northern Ireland
- Mazetown, County Antrim, a hamlet in Northern Ireland
- "The Maze" or "Maze District," the westernmost district of Canyonlands National Park
- Txamantxoia, a mountain in the Pyrenees also known as Maze

== People ==
- Colette Maze (1914–2023), French pianist
- Michael Maze (born 1981), Danish table tennis player
- Paul Maze (1887–1979), French impressionist painter
- Tina Maze (born 1983), Slovenian alpine skier

=== Fictional characters ===
- Mazikeen aka "Maze", in DC comics
- A character in the video game Fable

== Books ==
- Maze: Solve the World's Most Challenging Puzzle, a 1985 book by Christopher Manson
- Maze (novel), a 1993 light novel series by Satoru Akahori
- The Maze (novel), a 2004 novel by the Greek writer Panos Karnezis
- The Maze, a 1998 book by Will Hobbs
- The Maze, a 2004 novel by Monica Hughes

== Film, TV and video games ==
- Maze (2000 film), a 2000 film starring Rob Morrow
- Bhool Bhulaiyaa, or Maze, a 2007 Indian comedy horror film by Priyadarshan
- Maze (2017 film), a 2017 film by Stephen Burke about the escape from Northern Ireland's Maze (HM Prison)
- The Maze (1953 film), a sci-fi horror film released in 3-D
- The Maze (2010 film), a horror film
- The Maze (2018 film)
- William Kurelek's The Maze, a 2011 documentary film
- "The Maze" (Miami Vice), an episode of the television series Miami Vice
- Westworld: The Maze, the first season of the television series, Westworld
- Maze game, a video game genre
- Maze (1973 video game), a computer game
- Maze, an alternative title for the game Slot Racers
- Maze, a Fairchild Channel F video game

== Music ==
- Maze (band), a 1970s–1990s R&B/soul band
- Mazes (band), an English band
- Maze (album), a Japanese-language album by Nothing's Carved in Stone 2015
- The Maze (album), a 1999 album and title song by Vinnie Moore
- Maze, a 1999 album by David Kikoski
- "Maze" (song), a 2002 song by Japanese pop artist Koda Kumi
- "Maze", a song by (G)I-dle from the 2018 EP I Am
- "Maze", a song by Jessica Mauboy from her 2010 album Get 'Em Girls
- "Maze", a song by Juice Wrld from the 2019 album Death Race for Love
- "Maze", a song by Tohoshinki from the 2008 single "Keyword"
- "Maze", a song by Phish from the 1993 album Rift
- "Maze", a song by Varials from the 2019 album In Darkness
- "Maze", a song from the soundtrack of the anime Noir
- "The Maze", a song by Miles Davis from the 1985 live album Tutu
- "The Maze", a song by Lacuna Coil from the 2009 album Shallow Life
- "The Maze", a song by Stars from the 2018 album There Is No Love in Fluorescent Light
- "The Maze", a song by Janani K. Jha from the 2024 album The Rest of the Laurels
- "Maze Song"

== Other ==
- The Maze (painting), a 1953 painting by William Kurelek
- Maze (solitaire), a card game
- Maze, a term used in graph theory as it applies to topology
- Haunted attraction (simulated), also known as "haunts" or "mazes"
- Lower Maze F.C., a football club in Northern Ireland
- Scary Maze Game, a popular flash game designed to frighten the viewer
- Cox maze procedure, a type of heart surgery

== See also ==
- Maze River (disambiguation)
- Maize (disambiguation)
- Mace (disambiguation)
- Mase (disambiguation)
