= Maize (disambiguation) =

Maize is a plant cultivated for food.

Maize may also refer to:

- Maize (album), by Pushmonkey
- Maize (color), a shade of yellow, named for the cereal of the same name
- Maize (video game), a 2016 Point-and-click adventure video game
- Maize, Kansas, a city in Sedgwick County, Kansas, United States

== See also ==
- Corn (disambiguation)
- Maze (disambiguation)
