= Yellowfin bream =

Yellowfin bream, yellow bream, yellow sea bream, or yellowfin sea bream are the common names for several species of sea breams with very similar appearances:

- Acanthopagrus australis (also known as surf bream, silver bream, black bream, and eastern black bream), marine and freshwater species from eastern Australia
- Acanthopagrus berda (also known as goldsilk seabream, pikey bream, silver bream, black bream and picnic sea bream), marine species from the Indian Ocean
- Acanthopagrus butcheri (also known as black bream, southern black bream, silver bream, golden bream, and southern yellowfin bream), marine and freshwater species from southern Australia
- Acanthopagrus latus (also known as Japanese bream, West Australian bream, datina, and yellow-finned black porgy), marine species from East Asia, Southeast Asia, and Australia
- Dentex abei marine species from East Asia.
- Rhabdosargus sarba (also known as goldlined seabream, silver bream, and tarwhine), marine species from the Indo-West Pacific

== See also ==
- Black bream
- Silver bream
- Bream
