= Silver bream =

Silver bream is the common name of several species of fish:

- Blicca bjoerkna (white bream), freshwater species of cyprinids from Europe and Western Asia
- Acanthopagrus australis (surf bream), marine and freshwater species of sea bream from eastern Australia
- Acanthopagrus berda (goldsilk seabream), marine species of sea bream from the Indian Ocean
- Acanthopagrus butcheri (southern black bream), marine and freshwater species of sea bream from southern Australia
- Rhabdosargus sarba (goldlined seabream), marine species of sea bream from the Indo-West Pacific
- Bidyanus bidyanus (silver perch), freshwater species of grunters endemic to the Murray–Darling river system in southeastern Australia
- Bidyanus welchi (Welch's grunter), freshwater species of grunters from Australia
- Pseudocaranx dentex (white trevally), marine species of jack widespread in tropical and warm temperate waters of the Atlantic, Indian, and Pacific Oceans, as well as the Mediterranean Sea
- Nemadactylus macropterus (tarakihi), marine species of morwong found off southern Australia, the Atlantic coast of South America, and New Zealand

== See also ==
- Bream
- Sparidae (sea breams or porgies)
