= Datina =

Datina can refer to two different species of fish:

- Acanthopagrus latus
- Acanthopagrus morrisoni
