= Black bream =

Black bream may refer to one of several fish species:

- Black drummer, Girella elevata
- Black seabream, Spondyliosoma cantharus, a silvery fish found in northern Europe and the Mediterranean
- Galjoen, Dichistius capensis, the national fish of South Africa
- Macquarie perch, Macquaria australasica, an Australian native freshwater fish of the Murray-Darling river system
- Girella tricuspidata, a sea chub of the family Kyphosidae
- Sooty grunter, Hephaestus fuliginosus, found in rivers of Queensland and Northern Territory
- Southern black bream, Acanthopagrus butcheri of the family Sparidae, endemic to Australia
- Surf bream, Acanthopagrus australis of the family Sparidae, found off eastern Australia
- Japanese black porgy, Acanthopagrus schlegelii of the family Sparidae

== See also ==
- Bream
- Yellowfin bream (disambiguation)
- Bream (disambiguation)
- Black Amur bream, a species of ray-finned fish in the genus Megalobrama
