= Acanthopagrus taiwanensis =

Conservation status
- Data Deficient (IUCN 3.1)

Scientific classification
- Kingdom: Animalia
- Phylum: Chordata
- Class: Actinopterygii
- Division: Teleostei
- Order: Acanthuriformes
- Family: Sparidae
- Genus: Acanthopagrus
- Species: A. taiwanensis

Binomial name
- Acanthopagrus taiwanensis Iwatsuki & K. E. Carpenter, 2006

Species of fish

Acanthopagrus taiwanensis, the Taiwan picnic seabream, is a species of marine ray-finned fish belonging to the family Sparidae, the sea breams and porgies. This species is found in the northwestern Pacific Ocean in the waters around Taiwan.

== Taxonomy ==
Acanthopagrus taiwanensis was first formally described in 2006 by Yukio Iwatsuki and Kent E. Carpenter with its type locality given as the estuary basin of Tung-kang river, the types being bought at Donggang fish market. Previously this taxon had been regarded as a population of A. berda. Some authorities classify the genus Acanthopagrus in the subfamily Sparinae, but the 5th edition of Fishes of the World does not recognise subfamilies within the Sparidae.

== Description ==
Acanthopagrus taiwanensis has 11 spines and between 10 and 12 soft rays supporting the dorsal fin while the anal fin contains 3 spines and 8 or 9 soft rays. The body is rounded. The colour of head and body is mainly black, with a whitish belly and chin, there is a dark spot above the base of the pectoral fin. This species has a maximum standard length of 18.6 cm (7.3 in) for males and 21.6 cm (8.5 in).

== Distribution and habitat ==
Acanthopagrus taiwanensis is found in the northwestern Pacific Ocean where it seems to be endemic to the waters off western Taiwan where it is associated with river mouths.

== Fisheries and conservation ==
Acanthopagrus taiwanensis is commonly available in Taiwanese fish markets but is known only from its type locality. As the distribution, biology and population of this species are so little known the International Union for Conservation of Nature assess its conservation status as Data Deficient.
