= Paddy Compass Namadbara =

Paddy Compass Namatbara (1890–1973)

- Born: c.1890 Croker Island, Northern Territory, Australia
- Died: 1978; Gunbalanya, Northern Territory, Australia
- Known for: Bark painting

Paddy Compass Namadbara (also spelled Namatbara or Nabadbara), skin name Na-Bulanj, was an Aboriginal Australian artist and traditional healer, or marrkidjbu, from western Arnhem land. He was a member of the Alarrdju clan. Namadbara was renowned for his abilities as a healer, his bark paintings, and his skills as a mentor for younger generations.

== Biography ==
Namadbara (c. 1890-1973) was born on Croker Island in the Northern Territory of Australia in the late nineteenth century. He grew up between Cooper Creek and the Cobourg Peninsula. In his early years, he worked for Joe Cooper, a white buffalo shooter. After painting for Baldwin Spencer at Oenpelli, he went on to work for trepanger Alf Brown, after which he then went to work as the 'head man' at Reuben Cooper's timber mill at Iwalg. His normal work at the timber mill included shooting buffalo in the dry season and cutting timber in the wet season. After Cooper died in 1942, Namadbara worked at Marrganalal and Imbalmum before moving to Croker Island in the 1960s. In his later life, he moved between camps at Mountnorris, Malay Bays, and Murgenella, where he acted as a cultural and ceremonial leader. Namadbara reached the highest ceremonial status after he went through the Morak, Ubarr, Marrayin, and Lorrkon ceremonial cycles. Namadbara died in 1978.

== Family ==
Namadbara's father was a member of the Alarrdju clan of the Dua moiety. His mother was a member of the Murran clan. The land of both clans was Iwaidja speaking territory.

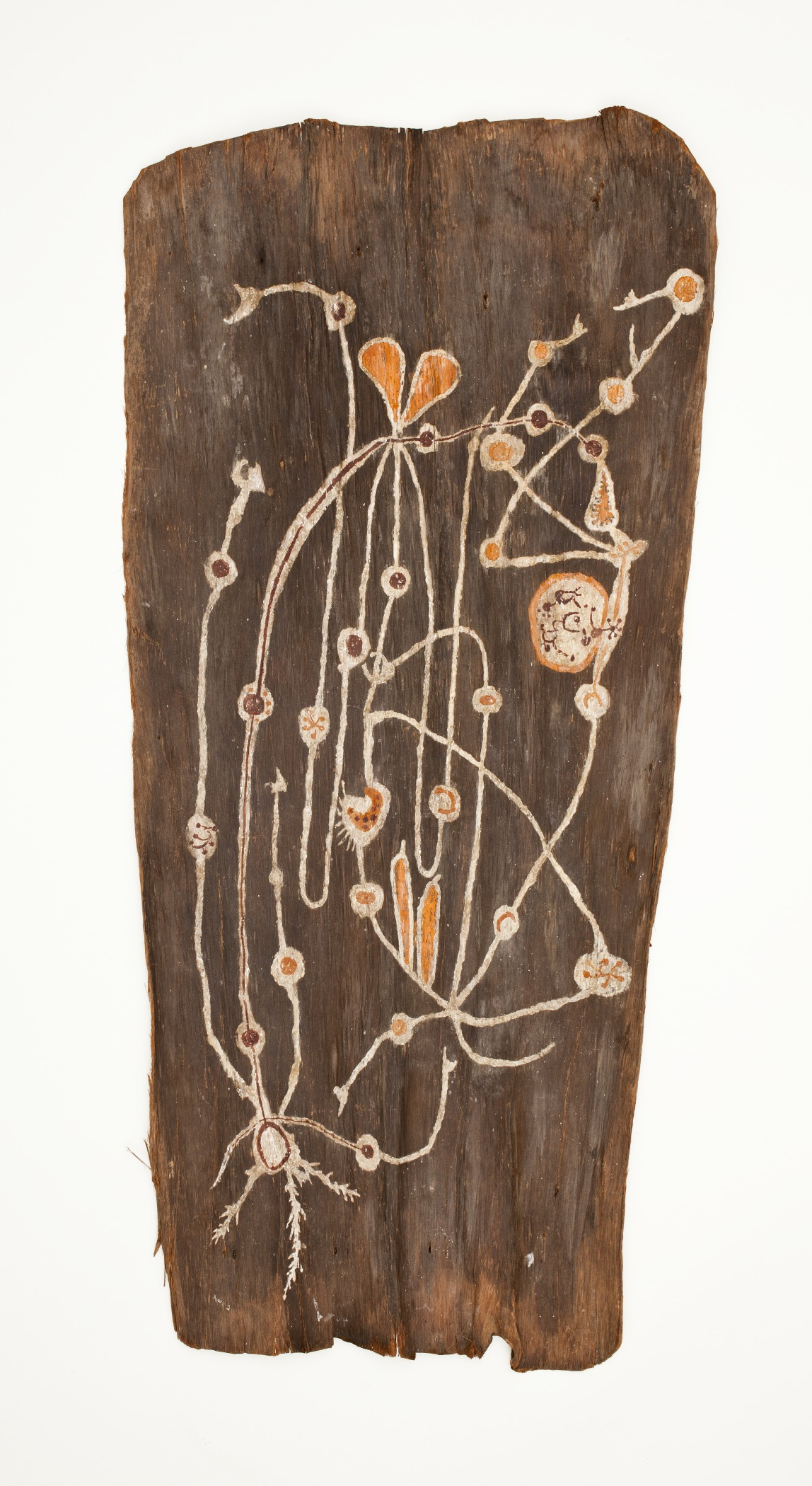
Bark painting by Paddy Compass Namadbara in the Los Angeles County Museum of Art.

Namadbara adopted the Aboriginal artist Thompson Yulidjirri as his son after the death of Yulidjirri’s parents as a child. Yulidjirri went on to pass on the stories of Namadbara to younger generations at the Injalak Arts and Craft Centre at Gunbalanya.

Aboriginal artist Gabriel Maralngurra is Namadbara's grandson, as the son of Namadbara's daughter Dolly Maralngurra.

== Artistic career ==
In 1912, Namadbara was part of a group of artists commissioned by Baldwin Spencer to produce paintings on eucalyptus bark. He painted multiple paintings for spencer, including one depicting a big barramundi and another depicting a bird, a barramundi, and two stenciled hands. Recalling the event, Namadbara describes how Spencer asked those at Oenpelli to stage ceremonies for him to document, as well as describing how Spencer played a role in forming some of the design elements in the paintings he commissioned, revealing that neither Spencer nor Spencer's friend Paddy Cahill were passive onlookers in the creation of the art. In the 1940s, he spent much of his time at Oenpelli (present day Gunbalanya), working and occasionally painting.

Namatbara was one of the group of artists on Minjilang (Croker Island) in the 1960s including notable artists such as Yirawala, Jimmy Midjawmidjaw and January Nangunyari Namiridali. The Methodist mission on Croker Island gave these artists a space for freedom in their artistic expression compared to the mission at Oenpelli. Their works were mostly acquired by collectors seeking works for major public institutions, before the widespread market acceptance that began to occur in the early 1970s.

A large bark painting by Namadbara's was gifted to the French Surrealist André Breton by the Czech artist and author Karel Kupka in gratitude to Breton for writing the preface to Kupka's book Un Art a l’État Brut, later translated as Dawn of Art. For many years, the work hung in Breton’s studio in the Rue Fontaine, before being transferred to the Pompidou Centre in 2003.

== Style ==
Namadbara belongs to what Howard Morphy terms the "Croker Island School" artists, many of whose works are hard for the untrained eye to distinguish from each other. Paintings from this school often consist of elaborate figurative representations of spirit beings and finely-drawn x-ray figures in white silhouette forms, reminiscent of rock painting styles, and Namadbara's works are no exception. The paintings from this time do not feature the rarrk that has since become iconic in Western Arnhem Land art. Namadbara, when asked about this by Lance Bennett, blames it on the artists being lazy, saying crosshatching is "too much work," but the absence of rarrk could also be attributed to its absence in rock art, traditionally being used only in ceremonial body painting.

Many of Namadbara's bark paintings have a dynamic energy that depict figures associated with sorcery and magic, and often are highly sexual in nature. His works often depict ancestral spirits, such as Mimi and Maam. The background of much of his work is plain, with the occasional addition of red ochre wash. Many of his works show male and female spirits depicted with pronounced genitalia and exaggerated limbs and proportions. Namadbara also depicted animals on his bark paintings, such as fish, echidna, and turtles, often depicting the inside of human and animal figures in his paintings so that artists in western Arnhem Land could pass off knowledge of the way animals are prepared for ritual obligations. Namadbara’s early work, Saratoga 1947, is an excellent example of the emphasis on fish and their symbolic significance in western Arnhem Land.

=== Yirawala’s Influence ===
Yirawala was a leading artist on Croker Island in western Arnhem Land, who had a strong influence on the development of Namadbara’s work in the 1950s and 60s. Yirawala encouraged particular themes in his bark paintings, particularly ancestral spirits, legendary figures, and some form of religion or sorcery. Namadbara adopted these themes and painted his own versions of spirits with distorted spines and the attributes of several different animals. It should also be noted that many of the spirits involved in his paintings were related to sexual matters in traditional Aboriginal society and that the inspiration for Yirawala’s work is derived from rock paintings in the caves of western Arnhem Land.

== Legacy ==
Namadbara's fellow community members held him to a high regard, and compared him to Western religious figures. He was a well respected marrkidjbu who could guide people through his knowledge of the future and his ability to ward off evil. Ron Cooper, a member of the Murran Clan from northwestern Arnhem land, grew up under the guidance of Namadbara. Cooper described Namadbara as:

He was a prophet. A very holy man. He knew what was going to happen to the people. He had already seen that. To me, he was a saint. There’s not a word like it. You know — say, we read in the Bible, we read about Jesus, we read about … But this man was a saint!

He was the last great marrkidjbu before Western medicine would overtake traditional healing practices in Arnhem land. Today, marrkidjbu are commonly mislabeled as "witchdoctors." As a marrkidjbu and cultural leader, Namatbara devised rituals, practiced sorcery, announced visions, gave advice, and provided healing. It was said that he could tell anybody what would happen in the future, including when boats would come to deliver supplies. One such ritual that he devised was one involving removing the kidney fat from a live cat and putting it into a tin, after which people would make all sorts of wishes with it by inserting red-hot pieces of wire into the fat. People in the community would wish for all sorts of things, like better housing, food, and work, and many of these wishes eventually came true. After a while, the tin was buried, and houses were built around it before it was moved to Wark after Namatbara died.

Apart from being a markidjbu and community leader, he was also an effective mediator between Aboriginal people and outsiders, working with Ronald and Catherine Berndt in the 1940s and 50s and Karel Kupka in 1960 and 1963. He also inspired other leaders in the community, such as Jacob Nayinggul, to engage in cross-cultural work.

Through his empowering actions, Namadbara helped his communities come to terms with dominance by European processes while empowering them to take a more active role in shaping their futures, making them feel less helpless in the face of such overwhelming changes. Although he began as a healer, he grew to assume a leadership role, providing certainty, guidance, and mentorship during times of struggle and change.

Beyond his immediate and direct work for his communities, he also had a lasting impact in the leaders he cultivated and the foundations he set for the future. Through kumula empowerment methods (described by Bininj as "giving power to people to enhance their already existing skills"), he helped prepare future community leaders for their leadership roles, ensuring that they would have the confidence to maintain strong ties between their communities and Aboriginal culture for generations to come. Jacob Nayinggul and Thompson Yulidjirri are among the young men of the region who were taken under Namadbara's wing and initiated into the traditions of Bininj. Yulidjirri became a mentor to a number of young artists at the Injalak Arts Centre and has been credited as a "formative influence" in the painting career of Maralngurra. Apart from this, Namadbara's work with Balanda (non-Aboriginal people) fostered greater pride in and respect for Aboriginal culture, knowledge, and tradition both among Aboriginal and non-Aboriginal people, setting the foundations for greater cooperation in the future.

The market for bark paintings emerged in the early 20th century. Initially, Museums and art galleries rarely included the name of individual artists. Rather, they would credit through identifying particular “clans” or geographic areas. Namadbara created works for early collectors and is finally getting recognition. His paintings today have an important connection with the community. Gabriel Maralngurra, Namadbara’s grandson says:

these paintings they remain part of us, part of our community. It doesn’t matter if they are far away, we still hold them close.

Identifying Namadbara’s work amplifies the significance of these artworks for contemporary First Nation communities, artists, and their families. On a global scale, it helps audiences better understand the ongoing cultural links to these works and this Australian heritage.

The book Clever Man: The Life of Paddy Compass Namadbara By Ian White is collection of oral narratives about artist and healer, Paddy Compass Namadbara. In 1995, the stories were recorded by Big Bill Neidjie, Bluey Ilkgirr, Jacob Nayinggul, Jim Wauchope, Johnny Williams Snr., Ron Cooper, Thompson Yuludjiri and others. These people are all from Western Arnhem Land and knew or had a personal connection to Namadbara. Until this book, the stories had remained unpublished. This book provides a complete biography of Namadbara's renowned powers of healing, sorcery, spirit possession and visionary knowledge.

=== Namadbara the Mediator ===
Paddy Compass Namadbara was an integral part of the first commissioned Aboriginal bark paintings and the development of an Aboriginal art market in Gunbalanya, formerly Oenpelli. Namadbara worked intimately with Baldwin Spencer to assemble the first collection of indigenous bark paintings from western Arnhem Land. In fact, Namadbara is the first artist known to have contributed to the Spencer/Cahill Collection in 1912.

Namadbara also painted at the Methodist mission on Croker Island starting in 1941, where he was able to practice more artistic freedom than in Oenpelli working with artists like Nangunyari Namirifali, Yirawala, Midjaw Midjaw. This group of Minjilang artists became trailblazers of modern bark painting in the early 1960s. Close relationships with anthropologists who were interested in their work helped to popularize the use of singular sheets of bark, though it was against traditional Aboriginal methods of bark painting, to make bark paintings more accessible for outsiders to view. Dorothy Bennett, Karel Kupa, Charles Mountford, and Ronald and Catherine Berndt represent a few of the most active anthropologists of the time in terms of their interest in Arnhem Land.

Namadbara often acted as a mediator between these outsiders and indigenous Australians. For example, Dorothy Bennett is an American anthropologist from Minneapolist, MN who was among the first anthropologists to work with Namadbara and his group on Croker Island. Ronald and Catherine Berndt were Australian anthropologists who engaged in extensive anthropological research during the 1940s and 50s in Arnhem Land, during which Namadbara acted as an informant, offering vital knowledge of landscape and culture in the Croker Island region. In the early 1960s, Namadbara participated in similar work, helping Karel Kupka conduct research on Aboriginal art in western Arnhem Land. During his time in Arnhem Land, Kupa influenced Paddy and his friends to create paintings that were connected to the spirituality of their culture and to the depiction of themes of sorcery and spirit figures, which had been suppressed by the Methodist missionaries, leading Namadbara to focus his work at the mission on spiritual images related to his cultural upbringing on Croker Island.

== Works ==
=== Spencer/Cahill Collection at Museums Victoria ===
In the 1910s, anthropologist Baldwin Spencer and buffalo shooter Paddy Cahill commissioned artwork from Aboriginal artists at Oenpelli, however they did not record the names of the artists. In 1967, a researcher named Lance Bennett interviewed Namadbara. Namadbara revealed that he had painted several of the bark paintings in the Spencer/Cahill collection, including paintings of a barramundi, a swamp hen, and a black bream. Namadbara painted the animals using an x-ray technique, where sections of hatching indicate the different interior physical structures of the animals. This technique of painting is drawn from local rock art in the region.

=== The Bennett Collection at the National Museum of Australia in Canberra ===
In 1967 Namadbara was interviewed by Lance Bennett, a researcher who came to Minjilang to collect bark paintings and data for his book on contemporary Aboriginal art. Namadbara spoke of his own works that are published in Baldwin Spencer's book Native Tribes of the Northern Territory of Australia. He spoke specifically about one of his works that features barramundi, a swamp hen, and a black bream and painted hand stencils. Bennett asked Namadbara to recreate this 1912 painting which is now in The Bennett Collection at the National Museum of Australia in Canberra. Namadbara told interviewer that Spencer had the artists create bark paintings on small, transportable bark sheets. This transformed traditional bark-hut paintings into an entirely new form: bark painting.

=== Auctions ===
There have been 28 works listed for sale by Paddy Compass Namadbara since 1997. Twenty of the works were sold, with a high price of $33,400 for his work Spirit Figures, painted in 1960 and sold in July, 2005. Namatbara’s works are currently held at Queensland Art Gallery, the National Gallery of Australia, and the Art Gallery of Western Australia.

== Collections ==
- Art Gallery of Western Australia
- Kluge-Ruhe Aboriginal Art Collection of the University of Virginia
- Los Angeles County Museum of Art
- Musée du quai Branly
- Museums Victoria
- National Gallery of Australia
- National Gallery of Victoria
- National Museum of Australia
- Queensland Art Gallery | Gallery of Modern Art
