= C2orf72 =

Human protein encoding gene

Identifiers
- Aliases: C2orf72, chromosome 2 open reading frame 72, Chromosome 2, Open Reading Frame 72
- External IDs: MGI: 1920042; HomoloGene: 54780; GeneCards: C2orf72; OMA:C2orf72 - orthologs

Gene location (Human)
Chr.	Chromosome 2 (human)
Band	2q37.1	Start	231,037,523 bp
Band	2q37.1	End	231,049,719 bp

Gene location (Mouse)
Chr.	Chromosome 1 (mouse)
Band	1|1 C5	Start	85,973,585 bp
Band	1|1 C5	End	85,983,178 bp
RNA expression pattern
Bgee	Human / Mouse (ortholog); Top expressed in: right lobe of liver; right frontal lobe; nucleus accumbens; ventricular zone; amygdala; putamen; caudate nucleus; Brodmann area 9; hippocampus proper; cingulate gyrus / Top expressed in: left lobe of liver; yolk sac; ventricular zone; Rostral migratory stream; left colon; epithelium of stomach; duodenum; medial ganglionic eminence; jejunum; substantia nigra; More reference expression data
BioGPS	n/a
Orthologs
Species	Human	Mouse
Entrez	257407	72792
Ensembl	ENSG00000204128	ENSMUSG00000026227
UniProt	A6NCS6	Q9CYS6
RefSeq (mRNA)	NM_001144994	NM_001144992; NM_001144993
RefSeq (protein)	NP_001138466	NP_001138464; NP_001138465
Location (UCSC)	Chr 2: 231.04 – 231.05 Mb	Chr 1: 85.97 – 85.98 Mb
PubMed search
- Wikidata
View/Edit Human	View/Edit Mouse

C2orf72 (Chromosome 2, Open Reading Frame 72) is a gene in humans (Homo sapiens) that encodes a protein currently named after its gene, C2orf72. It is also designated LOC257407 and can be found under GenBank accession code NM_001144994.2. The protein can be found under UniProt accession code A6NCS6.

This gene is primarily expressed in the liver, brain, placental, and small intestine tissues. C2orf72 is an intracellular protein that has been predicted to reside within the nucleus, cytosol, and plasma membrane of cells. The function of C2orf72 is unknown, but it is predicted to be involved in very-low-density lipoprotein particle assembly and also involved in the regulation of cholesterol esterification. This prediction also matches with the fact that both estradiol and testosterone have been reported to upregulate expression of C2orf72.

== Gene ==
Chromosome 2

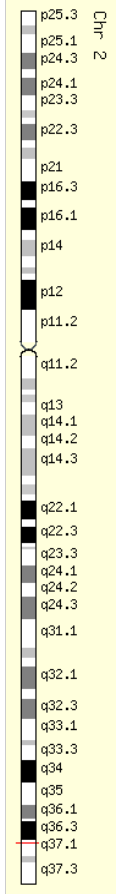
See the red band: 2q37.1.

=== Locus ===
C2orf72 is a protein-coding gene found on the forward (+) strand of chromosome 2 at the locus 2q37.1, on the long arm of the chromosome.

=== mRNA ===
C2orf72's mRNA transcript is reported to be about 3,629 base pairs long. It appears to have two polyadenylation sites near the 5′ end of the mRNA transcript, each preceded by their respective regulatory sequences, such as ATTAAA or AATAAA.

There are three predicted exons reported for human C2orf72.

=== Expression pattern ===
C2orf72 is preferentially expressed in brain, liver, placenta, colon, small intestine, gallbladder, stomach, and prostate, and to a lesser extent in adrenal gland, appendix, pancreas, lung, kidney, testis, and urinary bladder.

=== Predicted Biological Functions ===
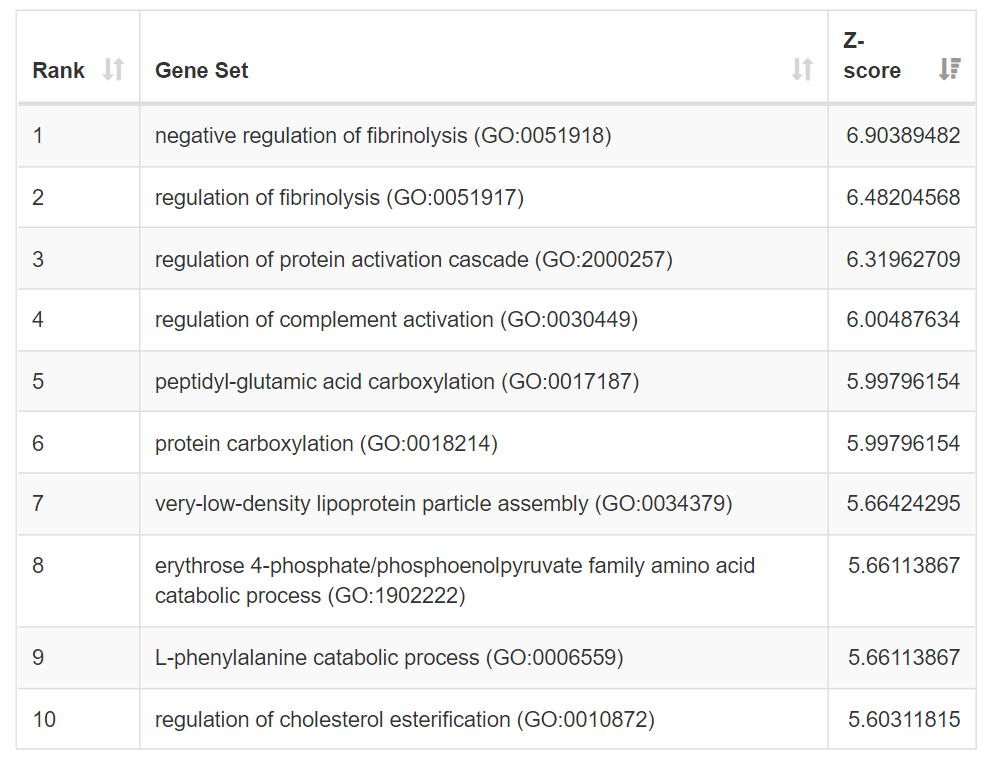
Top Ten Predicted Biological Processes (GO) as of July 16, 2022, via Archs4.https://maayanlab.cloud/archs4/gene/C2ORF72

It is predicted via Archs4 (July 16, 2022) that the function of this gene may be related to very-low-density lipoprotein particle assembly and also involved in the regulation of cholesterol esterification.

== Regulation ==
=== Gene-level regulation ===
==== Gene perturbation data ====
In a study of embryonic liver samples lacking hepatocyte nuclear factor 4 alpha (HNF4α), the expression of C2orf72 was downregulated.

Both estradiol and testosterone upregulate expression of C2orf72.

==== Expression pattern ====
C2orf72 mRNA and protein products are found preferentially in the liver, kidney, and placenta. The protein is localized to the cell membrane and cytoplasm in liver, brain, and placental tissues.

=== Transcript-level regulation ===
miR-1271-5p is a microRNA that could bind to the 3′ untranslated region of the C2orf72 mRNA transcript at 5′-...GUGCCAA...-3′.

=== Protein-level regulation ===
==== Predicted phosphorylation sites ====
There are at least two predicted phosphorylation sites for the human C2orf72 protein, one at threonine-286 and the other at serine-294.

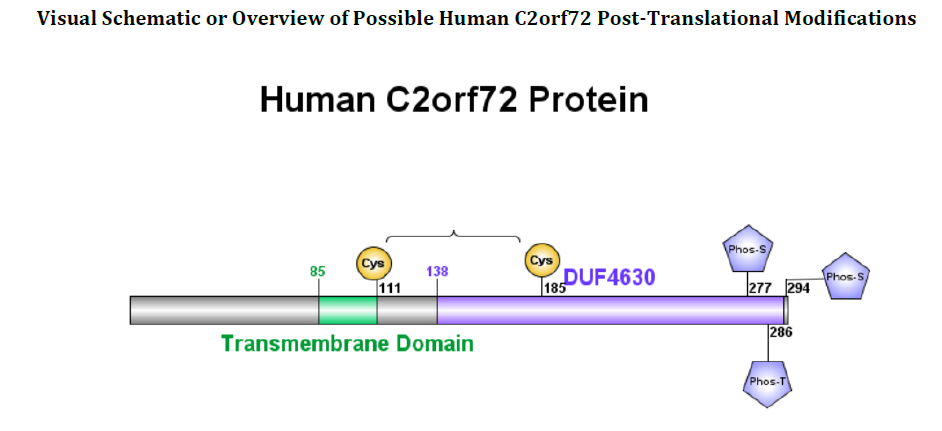
In this figure, in this case, I listed three possible phosphorylation sites: Serine-294, Threonine-286, and Serine-277.

== Protein ==
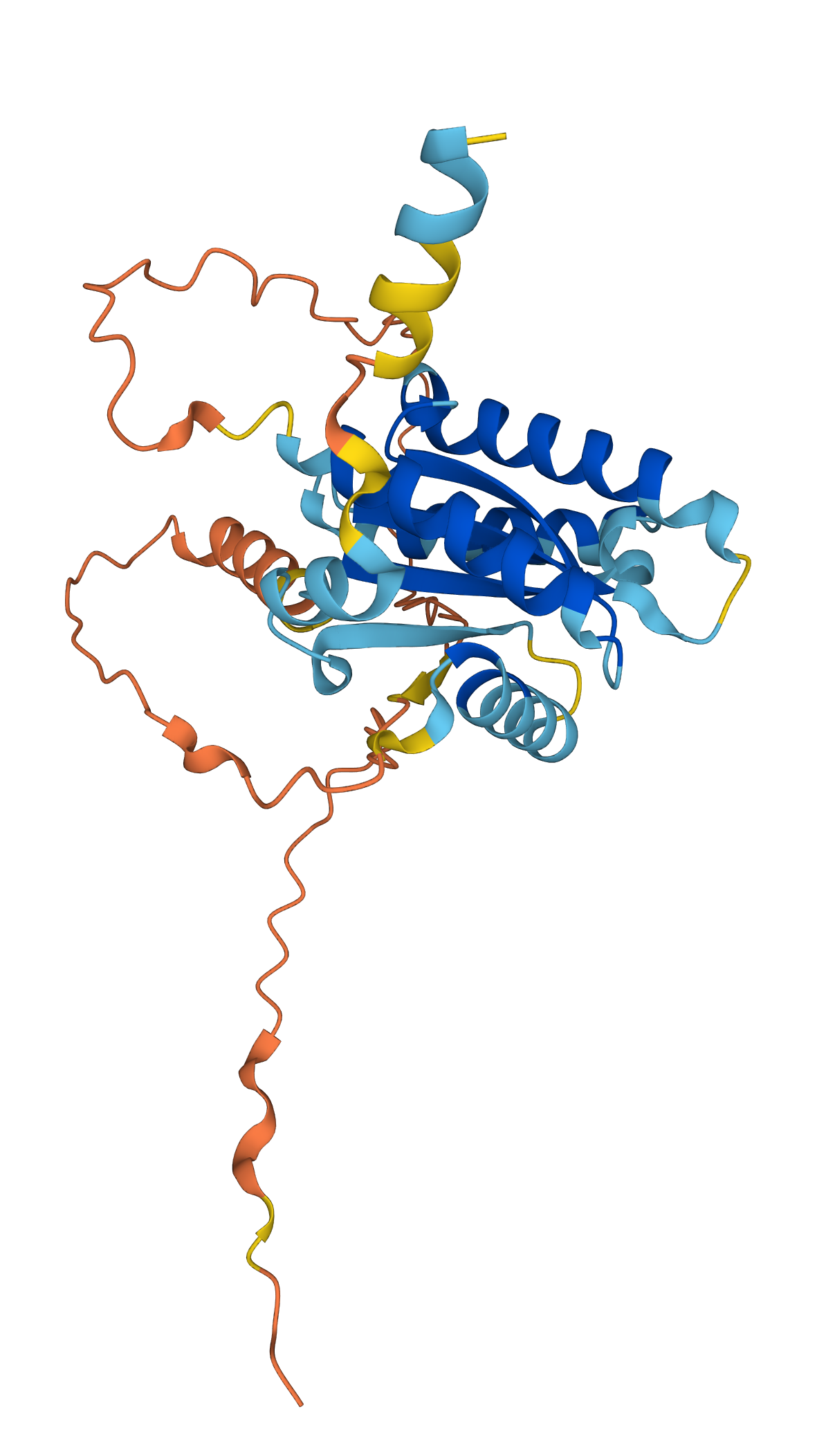
AlphaFold C2Orf72 protein structure prediction, as of July 16, 2022.https://alphafold.ebi.ac.uk/entry/A6NCS6

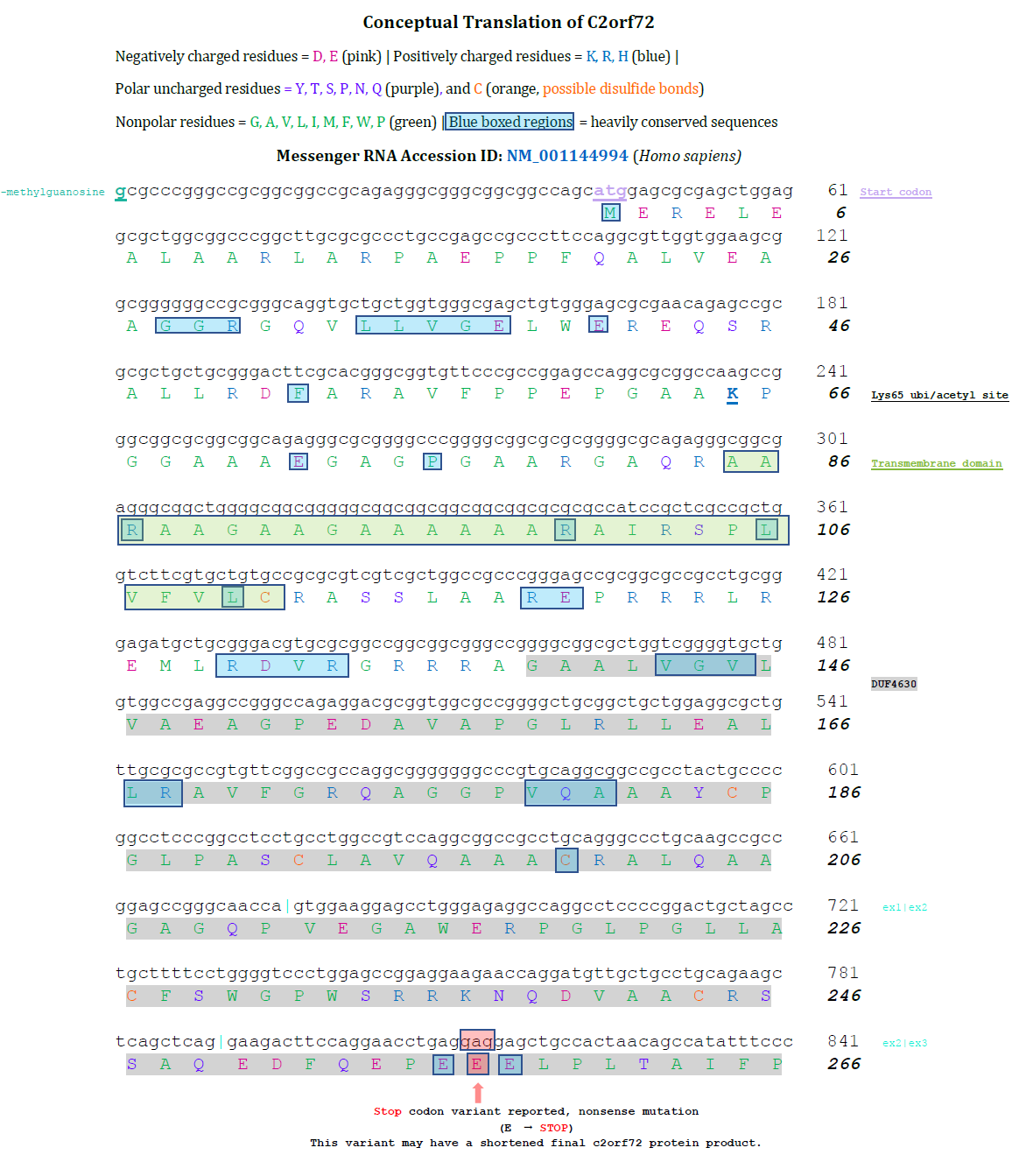

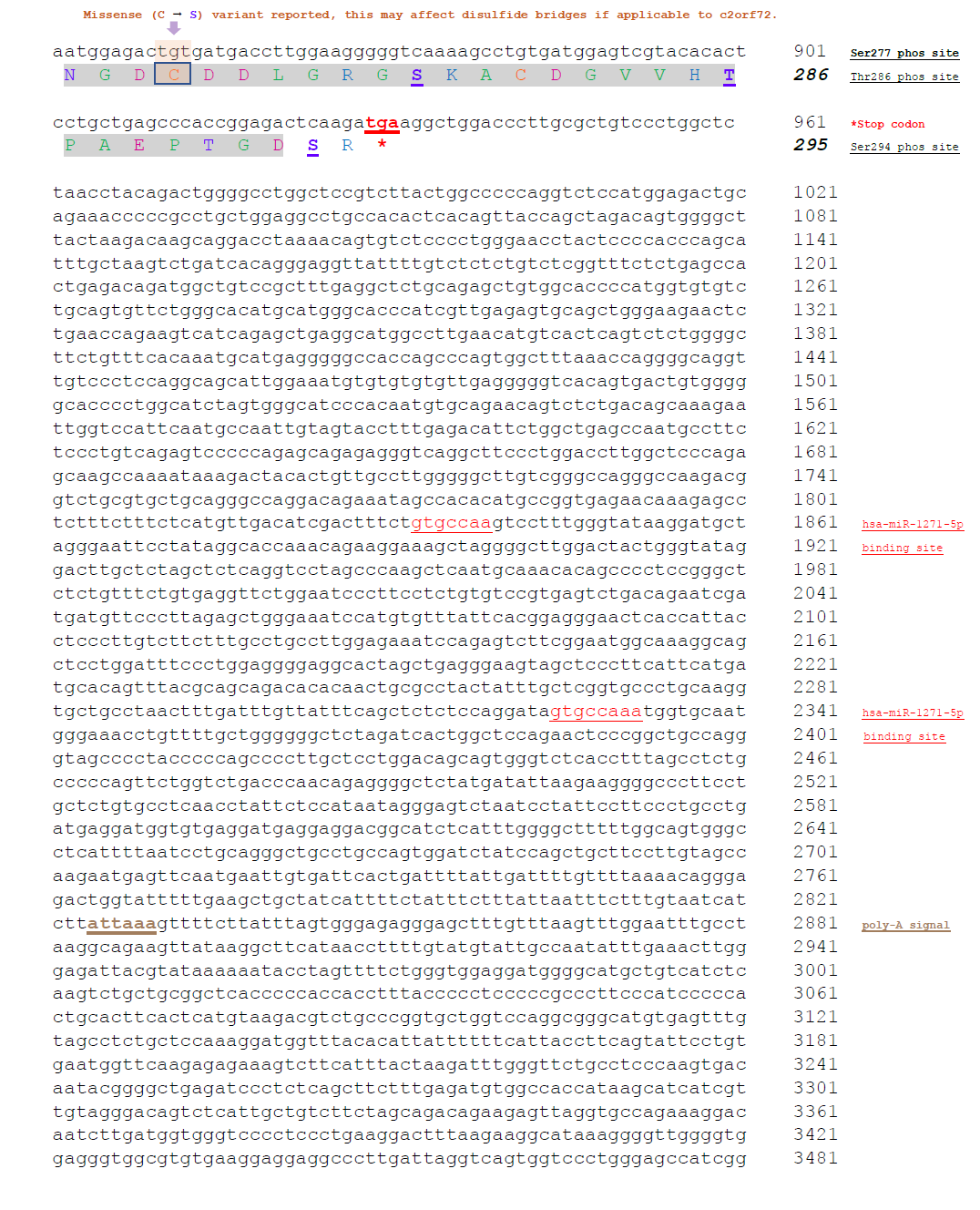

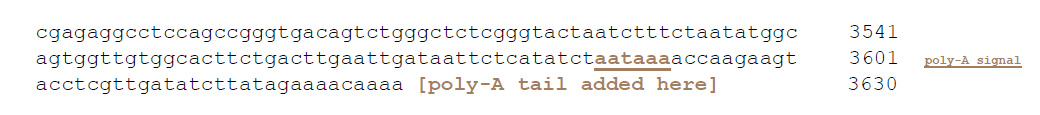

=== Human protein ===
The predicted molecular weight of C2orf72 is 30.5 kDa, and it has a predicted isoelectric point (pI) of pH 8.7.

There are eight cysteine residues, for a potential of four disulfide bonds. Most of the cysteine residues are positioned next to a polar amino acid (uncharged or positively or negatively charged).

At physiological pH, there are 33 positively charged amino acid residues, including histidine, most of which are arginines. Likewise, there are 33 negatively charged amino acid residues, most of which are glutamates.

There are 14 hydroxyl-containing residues (tyrosine, threonine or serine) that could serve as typical phosphorylation sites; most of these are serines.

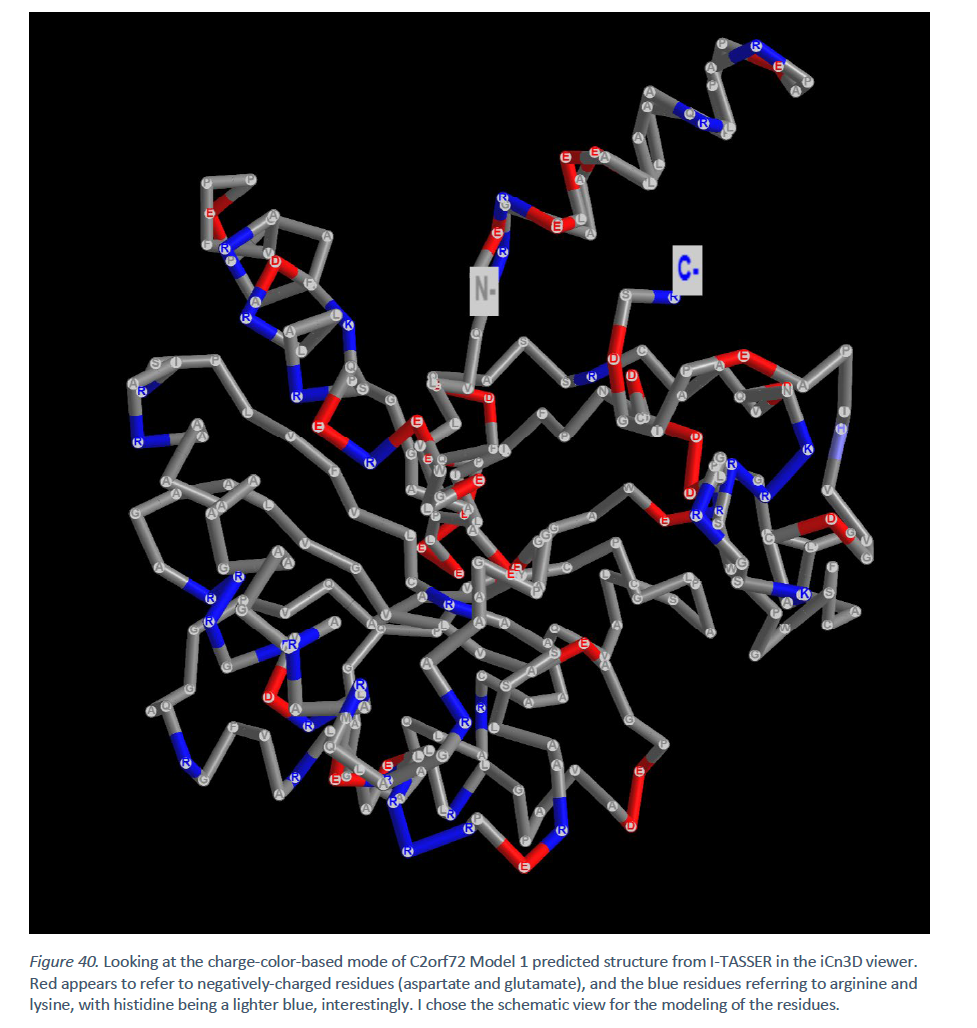
I-TASSER for Protein Structure Prediction (Performed Calculation Approximately in July 2021 for C2Orf72's Predicted Amino Acid Sequence, Raw Form).

== Interacting proteins ==
These proteins have been reported to interact with human C2orf72: RASN (GTPase NRas), RASK (GTPase KRas), and CD81.

== Homology ==
There are at least 203 organisms with an ortholog of C2orf72. The most evolutionarily distant reported ortholog of C2orf72 is in the Australian ghost shark (Callorhincus milii);, and it is broadly conserved from Actinopterygii (bony fish) to Mammalia.

Table 1. Examples of species reported to have C2orf72 orthologs
Genus and species	Common name	Order	Date of divergence from human (million years ago)	GenBank accession code	Sequence length	Sequence identity (%)	Sequence similarity (%)
Pan troglodytes	Chimpanzee	Primates	6.7	XP_516141.5	295	98.6	98.6
Pongo abelii	Sumatran orangutan	Primates	15.76	XP_024099683.1	295	95.3	96.9
Castor canadensis	American beaver	Rodentia	90	XP_020011841.1	282	77.6	82.4
Oryx dammah	Scimitar-horned oryx	Artiodactyla	96	XP_040084064.1	285	74.6	79.3
Sus scrofa	Wild boar	Artiodactyla	96	XP_005657646.1	282	75.3	80.7
Tursiops truncatus	Common bottlenose dolphin	Cetacea	96	XP_033715450.1	285	76.9	80.7
Felis catus	Domestic cat	Carnivora	96	XP_023115562.1	286	80.1	83.1
Eptesicus fuscus	Big brown bat	Chiroptera	96	XP_027993078.1	151	36.1	38.9
Corapipo altera	White-ruffed manakin	Passeriformes	312	XP_027503457.1	181	26.7	34.0
Pipra filicauda	Wire-tailed manakin	Passeriformes	312	XP_027606890.1	243	34.7	45.2
Taeniopygia guttata	Zebra finch	Passeriformes	312	XP_030136117.3	255	35.1	45.4
Corvus cornix cornix	Hooded crow	Passeriformes	312	XP_039412719.1	245	36.0	45.3
Hirundo rustica	Barn swallow	Passeriformes	312	XP_039930397.1	243	37.0	46.7
Aythya fuligula	Tufted duck	Anseriformes	312	XP_032049188	251	36.3	46.7
Anas platyrhynchos	Mallard	Anseriformes	312	XP_038039556.1	251	36.3	46.7
Protobothrops mucrosquamatus	Brown-spotted pit viper	Squamata	312	XP_029139335.1	278	22.9	34.5
Python bivittatus	Burmese python	Squamata	312	XP_025023716.1	279	23.3	35.9
Pseudonaja textilis	Eastern brown snake	Squamata	312	XP_026577460.1	272	31.6	41.0
Pantherophis guttatus	Corn snake	Squamata	312	XP_034263860.1	252	33.0	42.5
Pogona vitticeps	Central bearded dragon	Squamata	312	XP_020657305.1	295	24.1	34.0
Zootoca vivipara	Common lizard	Squamata	312	XP_034989711.1	285	37.9	48.6
Lacerta agilis	Sand lizard	Squamata	312	XP_033004091.1	289	38.0	49.5
Podarcis muralis	Common wall lizard	Squamata	312	XP_028587763.1	272	38.7	50.8
Gopherus evgoodei	Goode's thornscrub tortoise	Testudines	312	XP_030431493.1	481	24.2	31.1
Terrapene carolina triunguis	Three-toed box turtle	Testudines	312	XP_029766982.1	262	35.1	43.2
Chrysemys picta bellii	Painted turtle	Testudines	312	XP_023966073.1	306	36.6	47.4
Dermochelys coriacea	Leatherback sea turtle	Testudines	312	XP_038272534.1	271	38.1	48.1
Mauremys reevesii	Reeves' turtle	Testudines	312	XP_039344659.1	277	39.5	51.4
Nanorana parkeri	High Himalaya frog	Anura	351.8	XP_018432004.1	304	27.3	40.1
Xenopus tropicalis	Tropical clawed frog	Anura	351.8	XP_002937397.3	289	30.7	42.4
Rhinatrema bivittatum	Two-lined caecilian	Gymnophiona	351.8	XP_029473197.1	358	30.3	36.1
Geotrypetes seraphini	Gaboon caecilian	Gymnophiona	351.8	XP_033814148.1	233	33.9	44.2
Parambassis ranga	Indian glass fish	Perciformes	435	XP_028260036.1	334	19.7	34.5
Acanthochromis polyacanthus	Spiny chromis	Perciformes	435	XP_022050415.1	317	21.8	35.6
Acanthopagrus latus	Yellowfin seabream	Perciformes	435	XP_036971960.1	309	22.0	35.5
Cyprinodon tularosa	White Sands pupfish	Cyprinodontiformes	435	XP_038147473.1	296	20.1	33.1
Esox lucius	Northern pike	Esociformes	435	XP_012990404.1	332	20.6	33.1
Thunnus maccoyii	Southern bluefin tuna	Scombriformes	435	XP_042273029.1	329	20.2	34.0
Syngnathus acus	Greater pipefish	Syngnathiformes	435	XP_037106050.1	274	19.5	34.9
Callorhinchus milii	Australian ghost shark	Chimaeriformes	473	XP_007887618.1	413	17.6	26.5
