= Yellow-fin =

Yellow-fin may refer to one of the following species of fish:

- Yellowfin bream, several fishes in the family Sparidae
- Yellowfin croaker, a fish in the family Sciaenidae
- Yellowfin cutthroat trout, a fish in the family Salmonidae
- Yellowfin fairy-wrasse, a fish in the family Labridae
- Yellowfin grouper, a fish in the family Serranidae
- Yellowfin madtom, a fish in the family Ictaluridae
- Yellow-fin perchlet, a fish in the family Ambassidae
- Yellowfin pike, a fish in the family Dinolestidae
- Yellowfin seabream, several fishes in the family Sparidae
- Yellowfin surgeon, a fish in the family Acanthuridae (a type of "surgeonfish", NOT sturgeon)
- Yellowfin tuna, a fish in the family Scombridae
- Yellowfin whiting, a fish in the family Sillaginidae

It may also refer to:

- Yellow Fin (film), a 1951 American action film

== See also ==
- Yellow Finn
