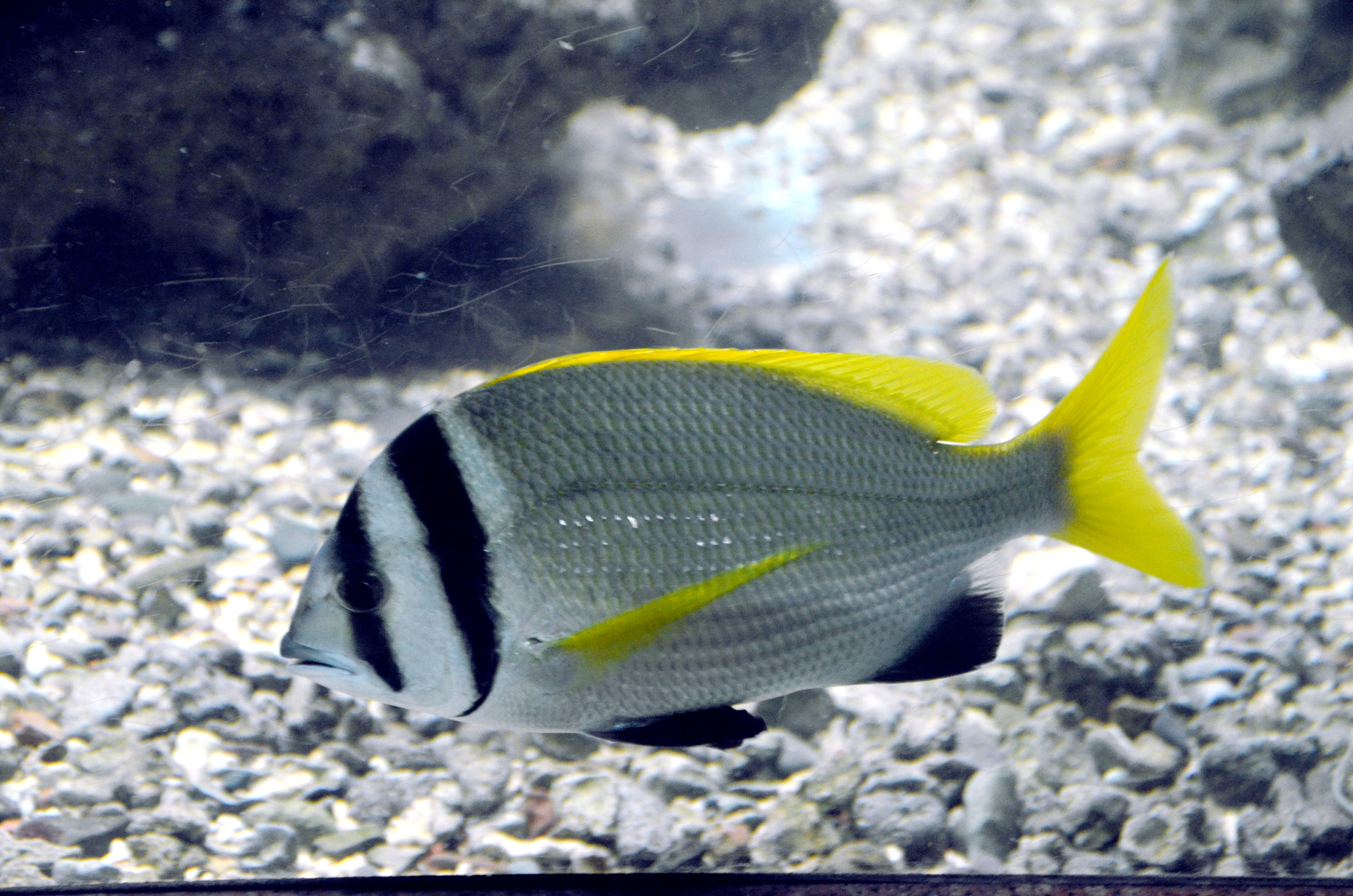

Conservation status
- Least Concern (IUCN 3.1)

Scientific classification
- Kingdom: Animalia
- Phylum: Chordata
- Class: Actinopterygii
- Division: Teleostei
- Order: Acanthuriformes
- Family: Sparidae
- Genus: Acanthopagrus
- Species: A. bifasciatus

Binomial name
- Acanthopagrus bifasciatus (Forsskål, 1775)

Synonyms
- Chaetodon bifasciatus Forsskål, 1775; Chysophrys bifasciatus (Forsskål, 1775); Mylio bifasciatus (Forsskål, 1775); Sparus bifasciatus (Forsskål, 1775); Holocentrus rabaji Lacépède, 1802

= Acanthopagrus bifasciatus =

Species of fish

Acanthopagrus bifasciatus, the twobar seabream, is a species of marine ray-finned fish belonging to the family Sparidae, the sea breams and porgies. This species is found in the northwestern Indian Ocean.

== Taxonomy ==
Acanthopagrus bifasciatus was first formally described as Chaetodon bifasciatus in 1775 by the Swedish-speaking Finnish explorer, orientalist, naturalist, and an apostle of Carl Linnaeus Peter Forsskål with its Type locality given as Jeddah in modern Saudi Arabia. Forsskål's description was published posthumously in Descriptiones animalium by edited Carsten Niebuhr. This species has been regarded as conspecific with A. catenula, but are now regarded as separate, the latter species having clear black margins to the fins. Some authorities classify the genus Acanthopagrus in the subfamily Sparinae, but the 5th edition of Fishes of the World does not recognise subfamilies within the Sparidae.

== Etymology ==
Acanthopagrus bifasciatus has the specific name bifasciatus, meaning "two-banded, an allusion to the two dark bands on the head of this species.

== Description ==
Acanthopagrus bifasciatus has 11 spines and between 12 and 15 soft rays supporting the dorsal fin while the anal fin is supported by 3 spines and 10 or 11 soft rays. It has a compressed, rather deep body which has a depth that fits into its standard length between 2.4 and 2.6 times. The dorsal profile of the head is straight from the snout until just past the eyes where it is slightly humped up to the origin of the dorsal fin. The background colour of the body is silvery, frequently each scale on the body has a black spot in its middle. There are two obvious dusky bars on the head, one from the occipital through the eye and across the cheek to the back of the rear of the maxilla and the other from the nape across the operculum. The pectoral, dorsal and caudal fins are light yellow, the spiny part of the dorsal fin being its most yellow towards the fin margin. Typically they have no black on the fin margins, although the caudal fin may have a thin black margin. May reach a standard length of around 60 cm (24 in).

== Distribution and habitat ==
Acanthopagrus bifasciatus is restricted to the northwestern Indian Ocean where it is found in the Red Sea around the Arabian Peninsula into the Persian Gulf and east to Pakistan. There have been three records of A. bifasciatus from the Mediterranean Sea, the first off Tunisia in 2010, the second off Barcelona in 2019 and the third in the Aegean Sea off Turkey, these are thought to have reached the Mediterranean Sea via ships. The twobar seabream is found on reefs in shallow inshore waters at depth between 2 and 30 m (6 ft 7 in and 98 ft 5 in).

== Biology ==
Acanthopagrus bifasciatus has a diet dominated by molluscs and other benthic invertebrates and is found in small schools. This species is thought to be a protogynous hermaphrodite as the population shows sex ratios biased towards females. Spawning takes plave between January and April in the Persian Gulf.

== Fisheries ==
Acanthopagrus bifasciatus is not intensively fished. They are taken using longlines, handlines, stake net fishing, trawling and fish traps. This species is taken in the southern Persian Gulf using dome-shaped wire traps which have a hexagonal mesh with a diameter of roughly 35 mm (1.4 in). In the southern Persian Gulf, A. bifasciatus is caught using dome shaped wire traps with a hexagonal mesh of approximately 3.5 cm in diameter. Traps are either fished individually or in strings set using by fibre glass dories aor traditional wooden dhows. The twobar seabream is exported from Oman to South Korea.
