= Jinde Bridge =

Bridge in Pingtung County, Taiwan

Jinde Bridge 進德大橋
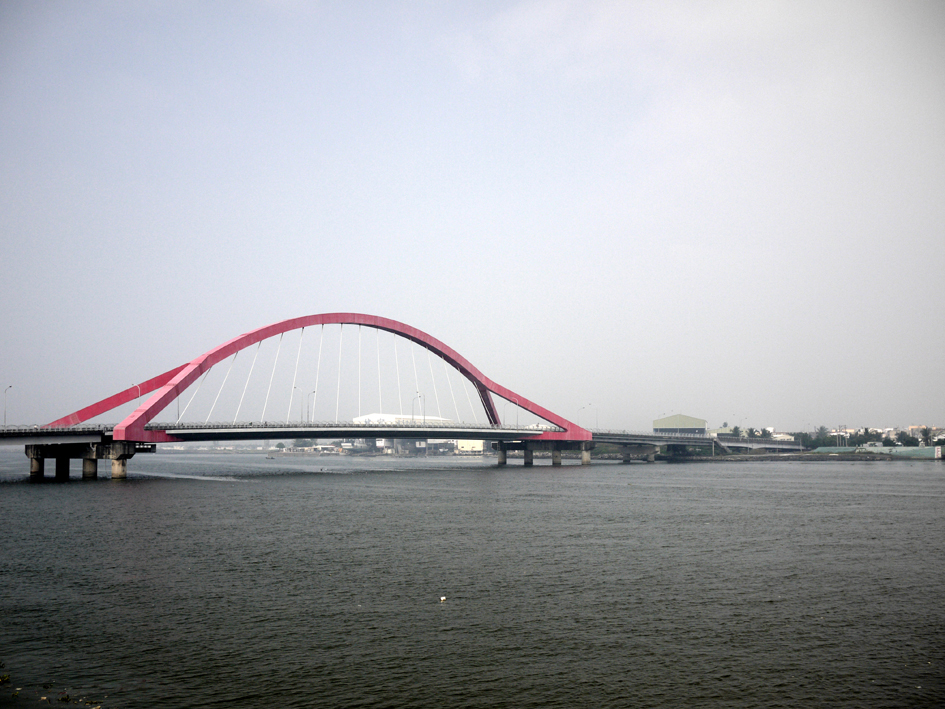
- Coordinates: 22°28′14.4″N 120°26′46″E
- Locale: Donggang and Xinyuan in Pingtung County, Taiwan

Characteristics
- Design: bridge
- Total length: 440 meters
- Width: 21.3 meters
- Height: 30 meters
- Longest span: 155 meters

History
- Opened: October 2002

Location
- Interactive map of Jinde Bridge

The Jinde Bridge (traditional Chinese: 進德大橋; simplified Chinese: 进德大桥; pinyin: Jìndé Dàqiáo) is a bridge connecting Donggang Township and Xinyuan Township in Pingtung County, Taiwan.

== History ==
The bridge was opened for traffic in October 2002. On 27 April 2014, the Pingtung County Government organized the bridge lighting ceremony for the bridge.

== Technical specification ==
The bridge crosses the Donggang River for a length of 440 meters and a width of 21.3 meters. Its main span spans over 155 meters and it has a 30-meter high arch.

== See also ==
- List of bridges in Taiwan
