= Acanthopagrus akazakii =

Conservation status
- Data Deficient (IUCN 3.1)

Scientific classification
- Kingdom: Animalia
- Phylum: Chordata
- Class: Actinopterygii
- Division: Teleostei
- Order: Acanthuriformes
- Family: Sparidae
- Genus: Acanthopagrus
- Species: A. akazakii

Binomial name
- Acanthopagrus akazakii Iwatsuki, Kimura & Yoshino, 2006

Species of fish

Acanthopagrus akazakii is a species of marine ray-finned fish belonging to the family Sparidae, the sea breams and porgies. This species is found in the Western Pacific Ocean around New Caledonia.

== Taxonomy ==
Acanthopagrus akazakii was first formally described in 2006 by Yukio Iwatsuki, Seishi Kimura and Tetsuo Yoshino with its type locality given as the Pecheus Bay yacht harbour in Nouméa on Grande Terre, Province Sud in New Caledonia. Some authorities classify the genus Acanthopagrus in the subfamily Sparinae, but the 5th edition of Fishes of the World does not recognise subfamilies within the Sparidae.

== Etymology ==
Acanthopagrus akazakii has a specific name honouring the Japanese ichthyologist Masato Akazaki, for his studies of sparid fishes.

== Description ==
Acanthopagrus akazakii has 11 spines and 11 soft rays supporting its dorsal fin while its anal fin is supported by 3spines and 8, rarely 9, soft rays. It has a deep compressed body and a moderately oblique mouth reach as far back as underneath the centre of the eye. The teeth in the jaws are arranged in between 2 and 5 crowded rows and there are 6 canine-like teeth in the front the lower jaw and 7 in the front of the upper jaw. The head and body of live specimens is silvery grey, paler on the ventral surface with dusky fins. This species has a maximum published standard length of 18.5 cm (7.3 in).

== Distribution and habitat ==
Acanthopagrus akazakii is found in the southwestern Pacific Ocean where it is endemic to the waters around New Caledonia. This species appears to be found in estuaries and is attracted to areas of high concentrations of nutrients caused by effluent.

== Fisheries ==
Acanthopagrus akazakii is caught in local fisheries and is sold commercially in New Caledonia.
