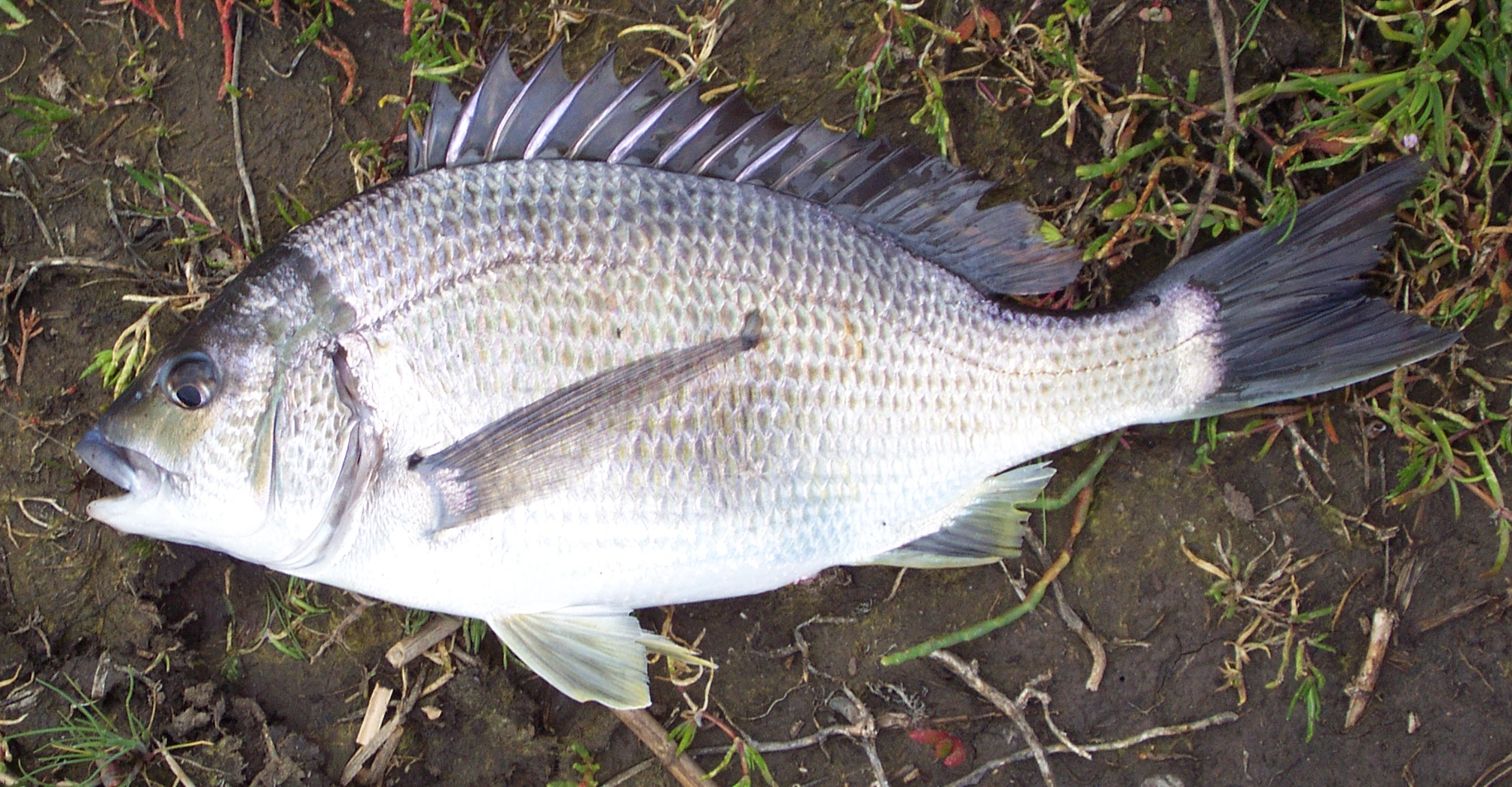
- Acanthopagrus butcheri

Scientific classification
- Kingdom: Animalia
- Phylum: Chordata
- Class: Actinopterygii
- Division: Teleostei
- Order: Acanthuriformes
- Family: Sparidae
- Genus: Acanthopagrus; W. K. H. Peters, 1855

Type species
- Chrysophrys vagus W. K. H. Peters, 1852

Synonyms
- Mylio Munro, 1949; Neosparus Akazaki 1994

= Acanthopagrus =

Genus of fishes

Acanthopagrus is a genus of marine ray-finned fishes belonging to the family Sparidae, the sea breams and porgies. The fish in this genus are found in the Indian and western Pacific Oceans.

== Taxonomy ==
Acanthopagrus was first proposed as a monospecific genus in 1855 by the German zoologist Wilhelm Peters, with its only species, and type species, being Chrysophrys vagus which Peters had described in 1852 from Sena on the Zambezi River in Mozambqiue. The genus Acanthopagrus is placed in the family Sparidae within the order Spariformes by the 5th edition of Fishes of the World. Some authorities classify this genus in the subfamily Sparinae, but the 5th edition of Fishes of the World does not recognise subfamilies within the Sparidae.

== Etymology ==
Acanthopagrus is a compound of acanthus, meaning "thorn" or "spine", this allusion was not explained by Peters but may be a reference to the robust spines on the dorsal fin and the enlarged second anal-fin spine of the type species, with pagrus, which is derived from phagros, an ancient Greek name for sea breams, used as far back as Aristotle's life.

== Species ==
There are currently 22 recognized species in this genus:

- Acanthopagrus akazakii Iwatsuki, Kimura & Yoshino, 2006 (New Caledonian seabream)
- Acanthopagrus arabicus Iwatsuki, 2013 (Arabian yellowfin seabream)
- Acanthopagrus australis Günther, 1859 (Surf bream)
- Acanthopagrus berda Fabricius, 1775 (Goldsilk seabream)
- Acanthopagrus bifasciatus Forsskål, 1775 (Twobar seabream)
- Acanthopagrus butcheri Munro, 1949 (Southern black bream)
- Acanthopagrus catenula Lacépède, 1801 (Bridled seabream)
- Acanthopagrus chinshira Kume & Yoshino, 2008 (Okinawan yellowfin seabream)
- Acanthopagrus oconnorae Pombo-Ayora, Viktor N. Peinemann, Collin T. Williams, Song He, Yu Jia Lin, Yukio Iwatsuki, Donal D. C. Bradley and Berumen, 2022
- Acanthopagrus datnia Hamilton, 1822 (Bengal Yellowfin Seabream)
- Acanthopagrus estuarius (Gilchrist & W. W. Thompson 1908)
- Acanthopagrus latus Houttuyn, 1782 (Yellowfin seabream)
- Acanthopagrus morrisoni Iwatsuki, 2013 (Western yellowfin seabream)
- Acanthopagrus oconnorae Pombo-Ayora & Peinemann, 2022 (Red Sea Yellowfin Seabream)
- Acanthopagrus omanensis Iwatsuki & Heemstra, 2010 (Black margined seabream)
- Acanthopagrus pacificus Iwatsuki, Kume & Yoshino, 2010 (Pacific seabream)
- Acanthopagrus palmaris Whiltey, 1935 (North West black bream)
- Acanthopagrus randalli Iwatsuki & K. E. Carpenter, 2009 (Middle East black seabream)
- Acanthopagrus schlegelii Bleeker, 1854 (Blackhead seabream)
  - A. s. czerskii L. S. Berg, 1914
  - A. s. schlegelii Bleeker, 1854
- Acanthopagrus sheim Iwatsuki, 2013 (Spotted yellowfin seabream)
- Acanthopagrus sivicolus Akazaki, 1962 (Okinawa seabream)
- Acanthopagrus taiwanensis Iwatsuki & K. E. Carpenter, 2006 (Taiwan picnic seabream)
- Acanthopagrus vagus W. K. H. Peters, 1852 (River bream)

== Characteristics ==
Acanthopagrus sea breams are characterised by the possessopn of a number of pairs of large, peg-shaped canines in the front of the jaw, an outer row of shorter canines along each side of the jaws and a few inner rows of rounded molar-like teeth at the rear of the jaws. The molar-like teeth become slightly larger towards the rear of each jaw. The dorsal fin is supported by between 12 and 15, infrequently 10 or 11, segmented rays and the anal fin is supported by 8 to 10 segmented rays. The second spine of the anal fin is very robust and is markedly longer than the third spines. Most of the scales are ctenoid but there are no scales on the space between the eyes. They have moderately deep compressed bodies and moderately large eyes. Their overall colour is silvery with a darker back and paler belly. The largest species in the genus is the goldsilk seabream (A. berda) with a maximum published total length of 90 cm (35 in) while the smallest is A. akazakii.

== Distribution ==
Acanthopagrus sea breams are found in the Indian and Western Pacific Oceans from the eastern coast of Africa and the Red Sea as far east as New Caledonia, south to Australia and north to Japan.

== See also ==
- Sparus
