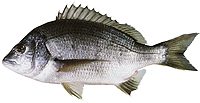

Conservation status
- Least Concern (IUCN 3.1)

Scientific classification
- Kingdom: Animalia
- Phylum: Chordata
- Class: Actinopterygii
- Division: Teleostei
- Order: Acanthuriformes
- Family: Sparidae
- Genus: Acanthopagrus
- Species: A. butcheri

Binomial name
- Acanthopagrus butcheri Munro, 1949
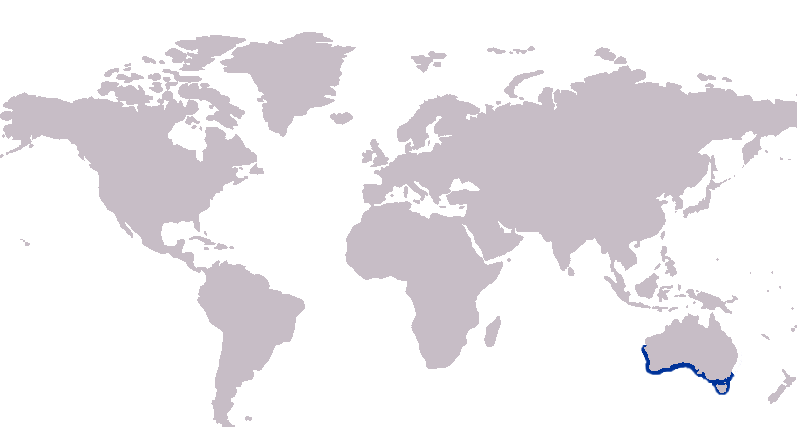
- Distribution of Acanthopagrus butcheri

Synonyms
- Mylio australis Günther, 1859; Mylio butcheri Munro, 1949

= Acanthopagrus butcheri =

Species of fish

The black bream (Acanthopagrus butcheri), also commonly known as the southern black bream, southern bream and blue-nosed bream, is a species of anadromous ray-finned fish of the porgy family Sparidae. A deep-bodied fish, it is occasionally confused with other similar species that occur within its range, but is generally distinguished from these species by a lack of yellow ventral and anal fins. Southern black bream are endemic to the southern coasts of Australia from Shark Bay in Western Australia to Ulladulla, New South Wales, as well as Tasmania.

The black bream is primarily an inhabitant of brackish waters of estuaries and coastal lakes, rarely entering the open ocean, as it cannot complete its life cycle in a fully marine environment. During the breeding season, the species is known to penetrate into the upper reaches of rivers to spawn, causing an influx of juveniles in the estuaries a few months later. It is an opportunistic predator, consuming a wide range of crustaceans, molluscs, polychaetes and forage fish.

The southern black bream is a major target for both commercial and recreational fishing due to its high-quality flesh, with over 300 tonnes of yield taken each year by commercial fisheries. Anglers also pursue the fish for its sporting qualities, with the development of lure fishing for bream adding to this attraction. Aquaculture techniques for the species are being developed, but its slow growth rate poses a major hurdle to large scale food production.

== Taxonomy and naming ==
The southern black bream is one of 20 species in the genus Acanthopagrus, part of the porgy family Sparidae. The Sparidae are perciform fish in the suborder Percoidei. The southern black bream was at first confused with its nearly identical east coast relative, the surf bream (Acanthopagrus australis), with specimens initially grouped under the name Mylio australis by Rudall, Hale and Sheriden. In a 1949 review of the Australian "silver breams," Ian Munro found that M. australis was in fact two separate species, creating the new species name of Mylio butcheri to accommodate the southern black bream. Munro based this classification on a number of new specimens, one of which was from the Gippsland Lakes, Victoria, which he designated to be the holotype. Mylio butcheri was later changed to Acanthopagrus butcheri when the true genus of the species was identified.

Acanthopagrus butcheri has a number of common names, many of which are applied to a number of related fish species, both in Australia and worldwide. The species is commonly referred to in publications as the "southern black bream" to avoid confusion with the black sea bream and other closely related species loosely given the name "black bream." The species is known regionally by the names "black bream," "Perth bream," "Gippsland bream" and the "blue-nose bream." The latter name is given to mature fish over 1 kg in weight, as at this point their snouts begin to develop a bluish tinge. The Department of the Environment, Water, Heritage and the Arts of the Federal Government designated black bream as preferred name. Black bream has also been designated the standard name by the CSIRO Division of Marine and Atmospheric Research in commercial fishing in Australia.

== Description ==
The southern black bream has a deep, moderately compressed body, with both the dorsal and ventral profiles equally curved. The mouth is of moderate size in comparison with the body, and contains six curved, peg like incisors in the front of both upper and lower jaws. The molars are set in series of four or five on each side of the upper jaw, and in series of three or four on the sides of the lower jaw, becoming smaller in size anteriorly. The body is covered with large scales, which may be cycloid or weakly ctenoid in shape. The head is mostly scale-free, with the exception of parts of the operculum. A low, scaly sheath covers the bases of the soft dorsal, anal and caudal fins. The lateral line scale count is 52–58. There is a single dorsal fin originating a little behind the posterior edge of the operculum, consisting of 10 to 13 spines set in front of 10 to 13 soft rays. The anal fin consists of 3 spines anterior to 8 to 10 soft rays, while the pectoral fin has 14 to 16 rays and the ventral has one large spine and 5 soft rays. The southern black bream is golden brown or bronze coloured on the back and sides, with greenish reflections when fresh, while the belly and chin are white. The fins are all dusky in colour, with the caudal fin often a dusky olive brown. The species has been known to reach a total maximum length of 60 cm (23 1/2 in) and a weight of 4 kg (8 3/4 lb) , but is much more common around 23–25 cm (9–9 3/4 in) and under 2 kg.

== Distribution and habitat ==
The southern black bream is endemic to southern Australia, inhabiting coastal waters from Shark Bay, Western Australia in the west to Mallacoota, Victoria in the east and south around the entire Tasmanian coastline. The species is primarily an inshore species, although has been found on rare occasions on deeper reefs on the continental shelf. Southern black bream primarily inhabit estuarine environments, penetrating into the far reaches of freshwater creeks and rivers during the summer spawning season. They are also known from a number of coastal lakes and intermittently open estuaries. In estuarine and freshwater environments they seek out the cover of structures such as fallen tree branches, jetties, oyster leases and rocky areas, while in deeper areas of coastal lakes, they are often found over bare mud and sand substrates. The species is rarely found in the ocean, but are often washed out of creeks during times of high river flow and are able to survive in the marine environment, where they inhabit inshore reefs and rocky shorelines.

The species is most common in southern Victoria, where it inhabits numerous estuaries. The Gippsland Lakes, Mallacoota Inlet and Lake Tyers are the most densely populated bodies of water in the state and the species is often found along the coast. It is not as prolific in South Australia, with the Coorong and Kangaroo Island being the main bream-producing areas in the state. The low numbers may be correlated with the state's lack of rivers and estuaries, although bream have been caught in unexpected areas, including the Gulfs, as well as deep rocky reefs off Streaky Bay in lobster traps. Southern black bream are prevalent in southern Western Australia, with large numbers of estuaries holding the species. The Culham and Stokes Inlets are known to have large populations of the fish.

== Biology ==
=== Diet and feeding ===
Southern black bream are opportunistic omnivores, consuming a wide range of prey, including sessile, burrowing, benthic and pelagic species. The diet of the species varies between rivers, with their opportunistic feeding methods showing little pattern between seasons, although they appear to have certain prey preferences when two or more possible prey species are present. Crustaceans, including crabs, prawns, amphipods and copepods, are commonly taken, as are a number of polychaete and annelid worms. Bivalves such as mussels and cockles are crushed in the bream's powerful jaws, with small fish such as gobies and anchovies also taken. Algae of the genus Enteromorpha are also a major component of most fish's diets. Fish feeding in the upper reaches of river have different prey, reflecting the freshwater fauna, with insects, hardyheads, tadpoles, brine shrimp and gastropods taken. Studies from the Swan River suggest that there is a shift in diet with age. Younger fish consume amphipods, polychaetes and small individuals of various molluscs. The number of amphipods consumed decreased in the diets of older fish while the number of large molluscs, crabs and teleosts taken increased. The fish actively forage the substrate while swimming with their head down, snapping their prey down with little chewing.

=== Life cycle ===
Southern black bream become sexually mature at different ages throughout their range, with Western and South Australian fish maturing by two to three years of age, while Victorian fish mature at five years. There is also a difference in maturation age between the sexes, as females generally mature one year later than males. The timing of spawning is also variable over the species range, with fish in Western Australia able to spawn from July to November, South Australian fish spawning between November and January and Victorian fish in October to November. Reproducing fish migrate into the upper reaches of rivers and streams, where they shed their eggs, with each fish producing up to three million per season. The eggs are small and pelagic, hatching two days or so after fertilisation. The young bream spend the next four years of their lives living in rivers, estuaries and parts of the coastline, often seen schooling over seagrass beds in shallow reaches of estuaries. It is when they reach five years in age that fish living in the marine environment move offshore to deeper reefs, returning to the rivers to spawn, as they cannot complete their life cycle in the ocean. Southern black bream are known to live to 29 years of age.

A number of unusual reproductive features have been observed in the species including a number hermaphroditic individuals which have both functional ovaries and testes, with the ability for a change to the preference of one sex also occasionally observed. The species has also been known to hybridise with the closely related species Acanthopagrus australis forming viable offspring, themselves able to backcross with the parent species. This is only known from one coastal lake where the two species are landlocked together for extended periods, promoting interbreeding and the production of offspring with morphological traits intermediate between the two species. The setting required to cause hybridisation, however is too rare to consider the two species subspecies, or even a single species.

=== Predators ===
Apart from humans, a variety of seabirds are the southern black bream's main predators, with the pelican, little black cormorant and great cormorant prominent. The species is also taken by larger fish including sharks, rays and a number of large predatory teleosts such as mulloway and flathead. A number of ectoparasites are known from the species, including species from the Copepoda, Monogenea, Branchiura, Isopoda and Hirudinea.

== Relationship to humans ==
Southern black bream are one of the most important species to both commercial and recreational fisheries throughout its range, valued for its flavoursome and moist flesh. Due to its marketability, as well as its high tolerance to a wide range of salinity, the species has become a candidate for inland aquaculture in saline dams.

=== Commercial fishery ===
The southern black bream is one of the most important species to the commercial fisheries in both Victoria and southern Western Australia, although only small numbers are harvested in South Australian waters due to the lower populations. Victoria produces the majority of the catch, with the Gippsland region alone producing 80% of the state's haul. A. butcheri has been taken from the Gippsland Lakes since the 1880s when they were the predominantly targeted species, although during the 1920s mullet became the most frequently caught species in the lakes. The bream catch from the lakes now fluctuates between 200 and 400 tonnes per year. The Mallacoota inlet and Lake Tyers make up the other important bream-producing regions of the state. In South Australia, bream are only commercially taken from the Coorong which has yielded 10 to 70 tonnes of the species per year since the 1970s. In lower Western Australia the Culham and Stokes inlet produce the bulk of the state's catch, with annual hauls far greater now than during the early 1990s. During the 1970s and 1980s, Western Australia had a modest bream catch of around 26 tonnes per year, a figure which rocketed to 103.9 tonnes in the 1992/3 season before receding to around 28 tonnes per year since 2000. The species is commonly taken by gill nets, beach seine and haul nets, as well as by handline. The fish are normally sold fresh whole or as fillets in local markets throughout the states they are taken in.

=== Recreational fishery ===
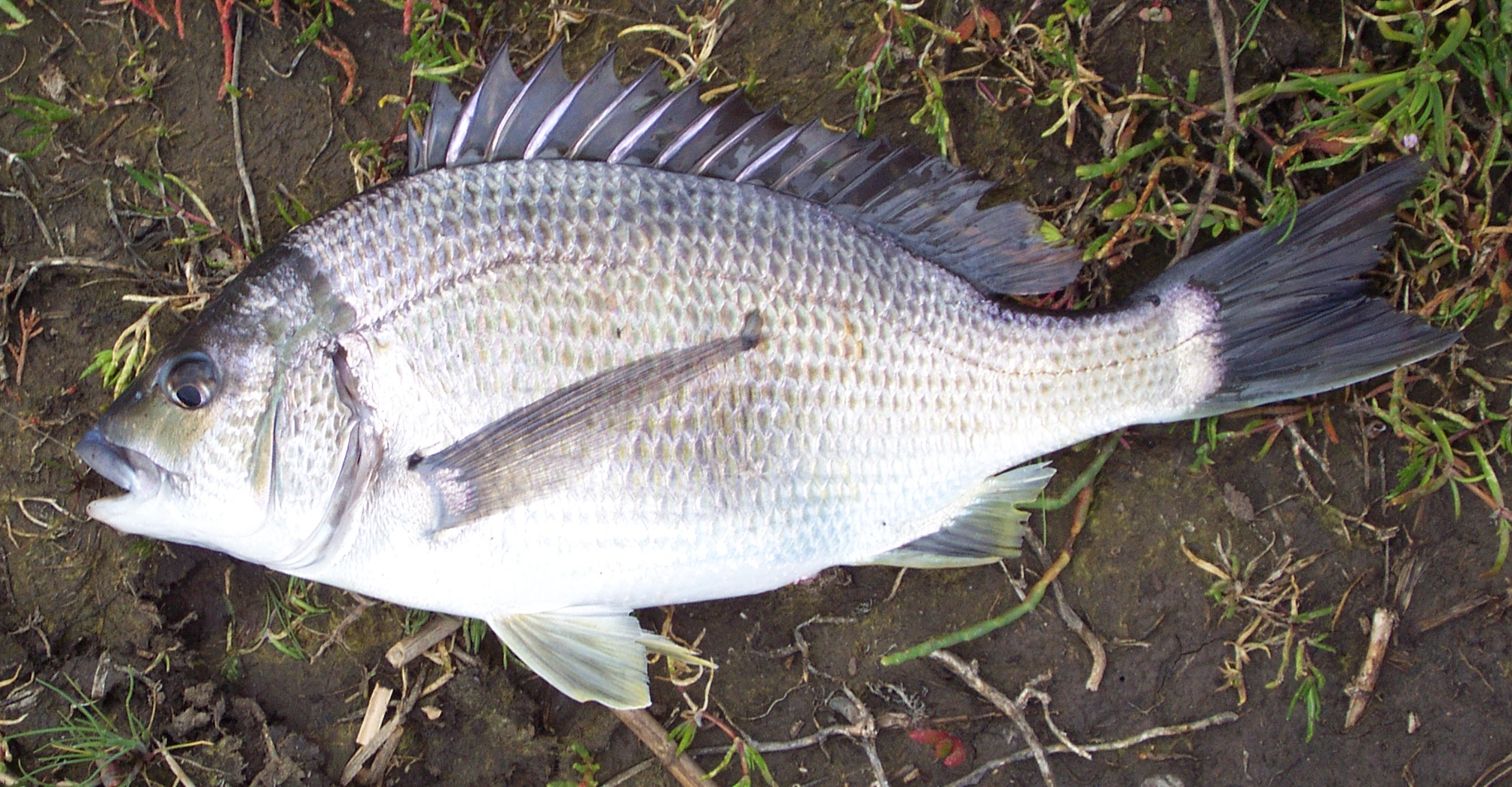
A southern black bream caught from Snowy River, Victoria

Southern black bream have long been a favourite target for anglers who seek out the species for both its fighting qualities and high quality flesh. Bream are also popular due to their accessibility, with fish commonly caught from harbour and estuary banks, piers and rock walls, therefore eliminating the need for a boat in most regions. Research in Western Australia has shown that anglers take more bream than commercial fishermen, with a 1979 study indicating that at least 232 tonnes were taken, more than double that of the commercial harvest at its peak, although with the advent of catch and release fishing this figure has dropped.

Bream are commonly caught around structures within an estuary, including fallen branches, piers, rock walls, bridge abutments and other man made structures as well as on mud and sand banks where shellfish and crustaceans dwell. Although bream are opportunistic feeders, they can often be very difficult to catch in areas subject to high fishing pressure. Light fishing lines and sinkers are used to avoid spooking the fish and, as with all fishing, live bait produces the best results. Various crustaceans such as nippers, prawns and crabs are commonly used alongside various species of beach and tube worm. Frozen and cut bait such as prawns, mussels, cockles and fish pieces are also effective. Rigs are usually kept simple and light, with running ball or bean sinkers used on a light line from two up to four kilograms in breaking strength tied to a size 6 – 1 hook. In fast flowing waters, heavier sinkers may be needed to keep the bait in the target area long enough to be noticed by a fish. Burley is often introduced into the water, with chopped pilchards or chicken pellets soaked in fish oil popular amongst anglers. In recent years, the use of lures and flies on southern black bream has been successfully developed, with the species known to attack both hard bodied minnow and spinnerbait type lures, as well as soft plastic lures and saltwater flies.

The southern black bream is protected by size and bag limits in all the states it inhabits, which anglers must be aware of or face fines. In Western Australia the size limit is 25 cm with only 2 fish over 40 cm allowed to be taken from the Swan or Canning Rivers, while the bag limit varies throughout the state with West Coast allowing 4 per angler, Gascoyne 8 per angler, and Southern and Northern 20 per angler. In South Australia the daily bag limit is 10 per person, with a minimum legal size of 30 cm, which is the same limit as Victoria.

=== Aquaculture ===
Southern black bream are relatively easy to grow in captivity, with fish usually spawning during their natural season without needing the addition of hormones. Despite this, bream are not bred on a commercial basis due to a comparatively slow growth rate and a low fillet recovery. Studies by Sarre in 1999, however, showed that the species can survive well in saline ponds with deep enough waters as long as food is supplemented to the ponds. This has led to the proposal of the breeding of the species to stock inland saline ponds for the use of recreational fishing, much like trout and barramundi are stocked elsewhere in Australia. Although the growth rate is currently too slow for food production purposes, genetic selection may allow the breeding of faster-growing fish for market purposes. Southern black bream are currently bred to stock depleted estuaries, and thus their requirements for farming are already well known.

== Similar species ==
A number of other members of the Sparidae inhabit Australian waters and maybe confused with A. butcheri. The yellowfin bream, Acanthopagrus australis is the most similar species to A. butcheri, overlapping in northern Victoria, with hybridisation events suggesting a recent divergence time, allowing few genetic differences to accumulate between the species. As its name suggests, the yellow fins of the yellowfin bream are distinctive. Overlapping the distribution of A. butcheri in the west is Acanthopagrus morrisoni, the western yellowfin bream, which can be distinguished by the prominent yellow ventral, anal and lower caudal fins. The tarwhine, Rhabdosargus sarba, is also similar in shape, but possesses gold horizontal stripes which allow for identification.
