= Donggang River (Taiwan) =

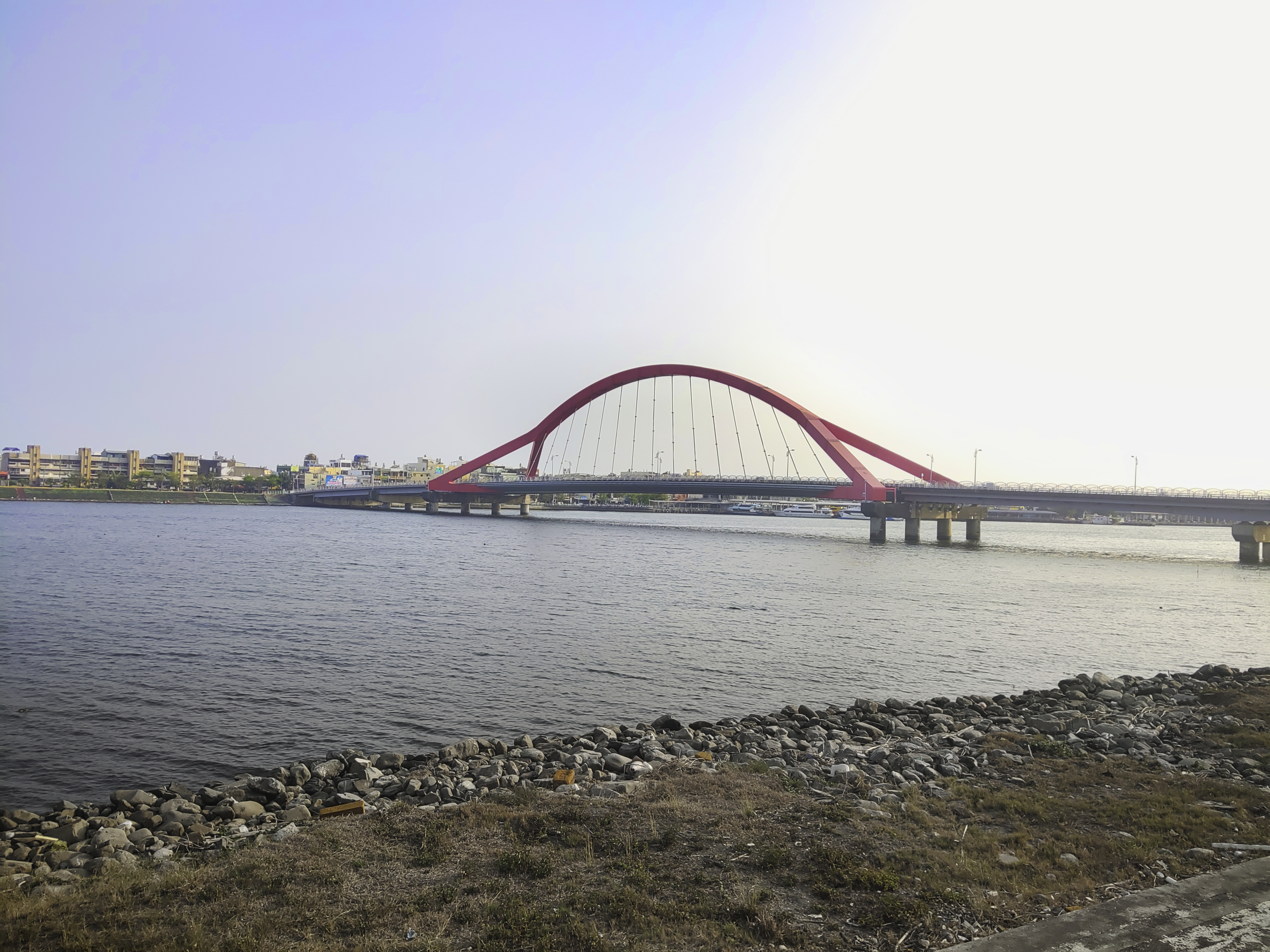

- Donggang River in Taiwan

Location
- Country: Taiwan

Physical characteristics
- Mouth
  - location: South China Sea: Donggang, Pingtung
  - coordinates: 22.468°N 120.437°E
- Length: 44 km (27 mi)
- Basin size: 472 km^{2} (182 sq mi)

The Donggang River (Chinese: 東港溪; pinyin: Dōnggǎng Xī; Wade–Giles: Tung^{1}-kang^{3} Hsi^{1}; Pe̍h-ōe-jī: Tang-káng-khoe) is a river in Taiwan. It flows through Pingtung County for 44 km.

== Bridges ==
- Jinde Bridge

== See also ==
- List of rivers in Taiwan
