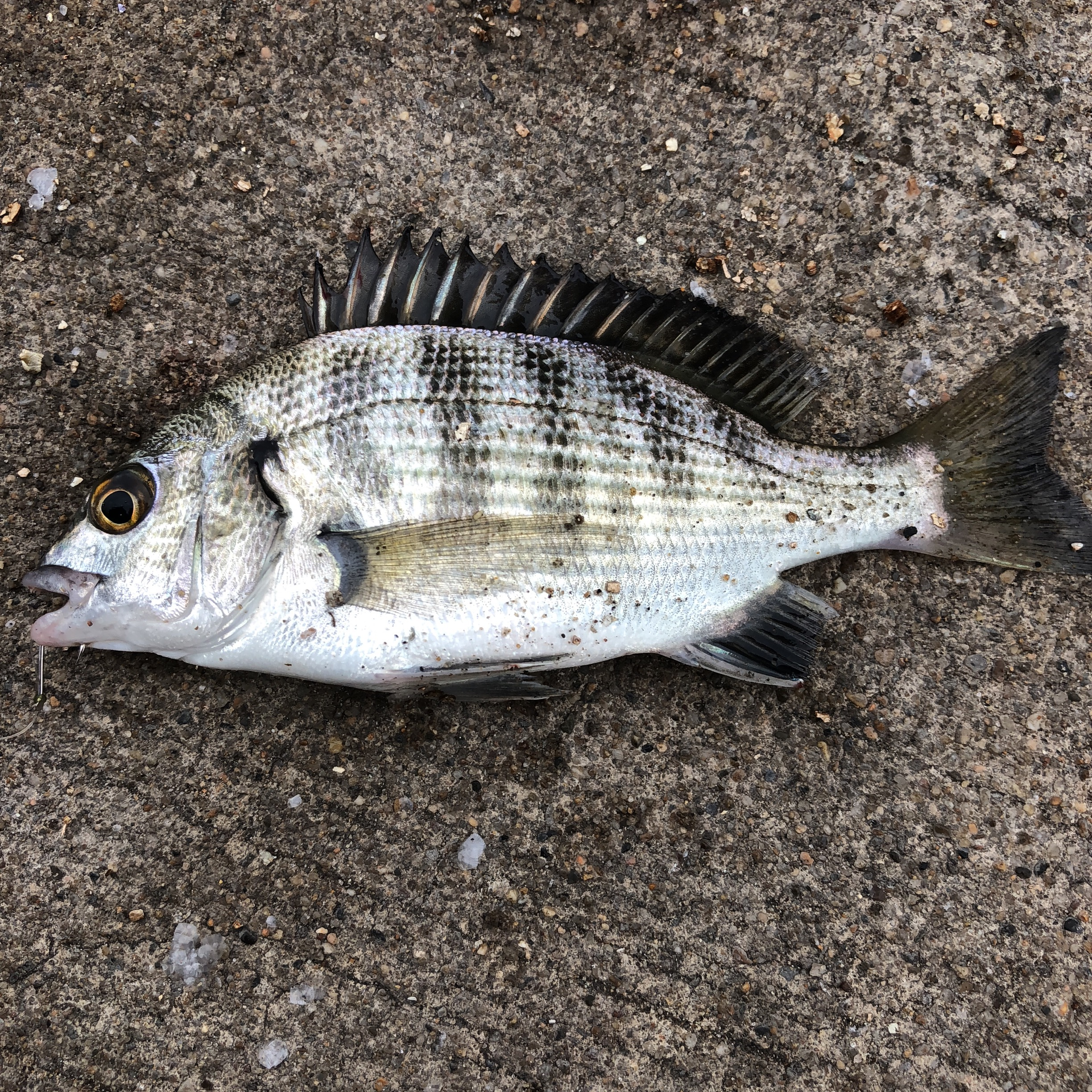

Conservation status
- Least Concern (IUCN 3.1)

Scientific classification
- Kingdom: Animalia
- Phylum: Chordata
- Class: Actinopterygii
- Division: Teleostei
- Order: Acanthuriformes
- Family: Sparidae
- Genus: Acanthopagrus
- Species: A. schlegelii

Binomial name
- Acanthopagrus schlegelii (Bleeker, 1854)

Synonyms
- Chrysophrys schlegelii Bleeker, 1854; Acanthopagrus schlegelii schlegelii (Bleeker, 1854); Pagrus macrocephalus Basilewsky, 1855; Mylio macrocephalus (Basilewsky, 1855); Sparus macrocephalus (Basilewsky, 1855); Sparus swinhonis czerskii Berg, 1914; Acanthopagrus schlegelii czerskii (Berg, 1914); Acanthopagrus swinhonis czerskii (Berg, 1914); Sparus macrocephalus czerskii Berg, 1914

= Acanthopagrus schlegelii =

Species of fish

Acanthopagrus schlegelii, the blackhead seabream, black porgy or black seabream, is a species of marine ray-finned fish belonging to the family Sparidae, the seabreams and porgies. This species is found in the Western Pacific Ocean. The blackhead seabream is an important species in commercial fisheries, particularly in Vietnam.

== Taxonomy ==
Acanthopagrus schlegelii was first formally described as Chrysophrys schlegelii in 1854 by the Dutch physician, herpetologist and ichthyologist Pieter Bleeker with its type locality given as Nagasaki. Some workers have suggested that there are two species within this taxon, A. schlegelii and A. czerskii, while others treat these as subspecies within the same species. Some authorities classify the genus Acanthopagrus in the subfamily Sparinae, but the 5th edition of Fishes of the World does not recognise subfamilies within the Sparidae.

== Etymology ==
Acanthopagrus schlegelii has a specific name that honours the German ornithologist and herpetologist Hermann Schlegel who co-wrote Fauna Japonica with Coenraad Jacob Temminck, a book Bleeker often cited. The subspecies A. s. czerskii honours the ornithologists Alexander Ivanovich Czerski, the son of Jan Czerski, a celebrated Polish geologist, naturalist and explorer, who collected the type specimen.

== Description ==
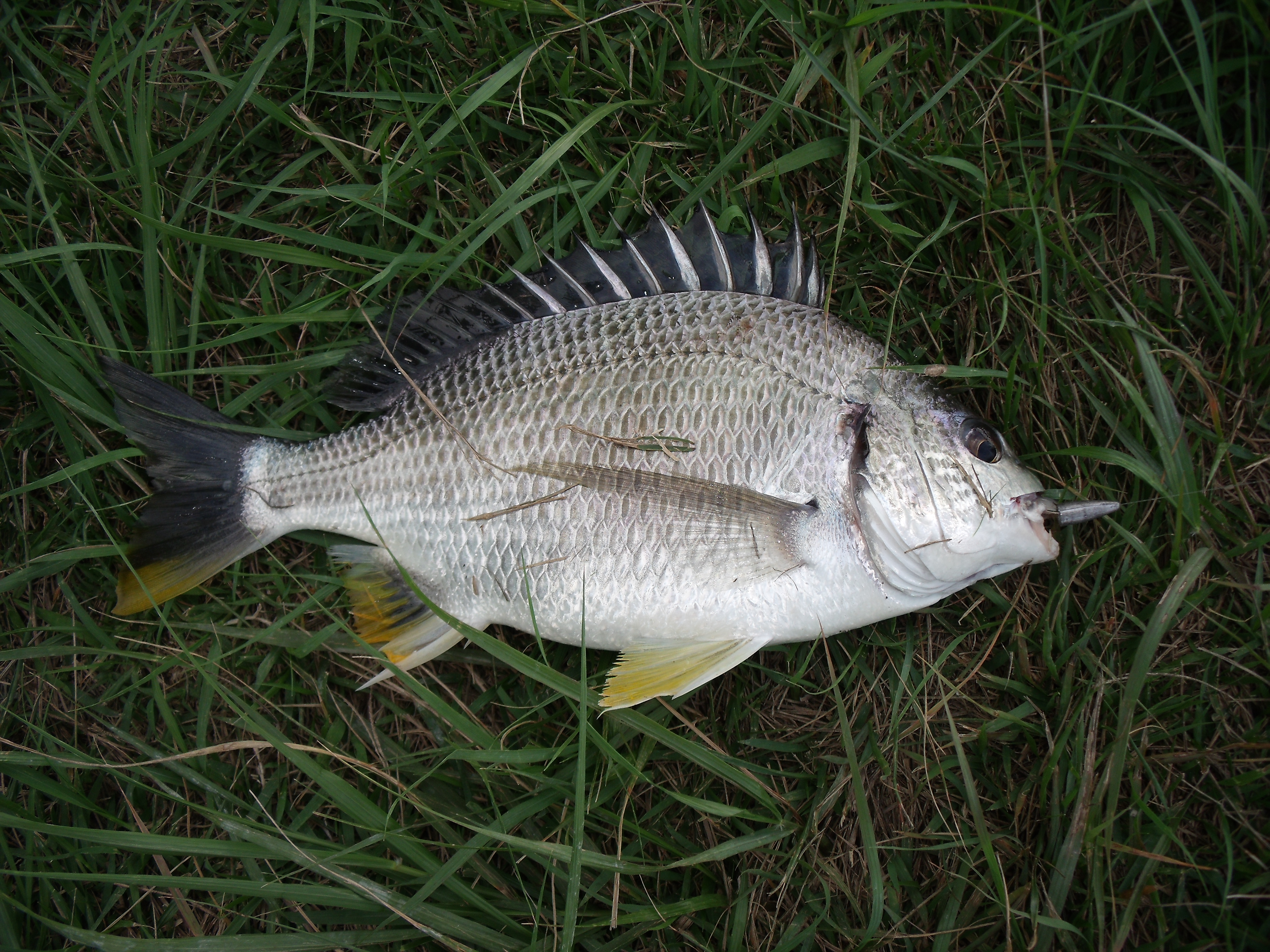

Acanthopagrus schlegelii has its dorsal fin supported by 11 or 12 spines and 11 soft rays while the anal fin contains 3 spines and 8 soft rays. This species differs from the other species in the genus Acanthopagrus by having pale dorsal, caudal, anal, and pelvic fins being light colour. The overall colour is black or grey, silvery on the belly, with indistinct vertical stripes along the body and a round spot on the upper margin of the operculum. The maximum published standard length for this species is 50 cm (20 in).

== Distribution and habitat ==
Acanthopagrus schlegelii is found in the northwestern Pacific Ocean where it is found in the Sea Of Japan, the eastern coast Japan from central Honshu south, the Yellow Sea and the East and South China Seas. This species is found in sheltered bays, on shallow rocky reefs and in brackish waters down as deep as 50 m (160 ft).

== Biology ==
Acanthopagrus schlegelii is a predatory species feeding on molluscs and polychaetes. It is a protandrous hermaphrodite that spawns during the spring and summer. They spawning behaviour reaches its daily peaks just before sunset and the reduction in light levels appears to stimulate the fish to spawn. Males have a maximum age of 20 years and females 28 years and males are more numerous in the lower size classes.

== Fisheries and aquaculture ==
Acanthopagrus schlegelii is an important food fish in Vietnam. This species is an important fish in aquaculture in Korea, China and Japan. China produced 123,000 t (121,000 long tons; 136,000 short tons) in 2022.

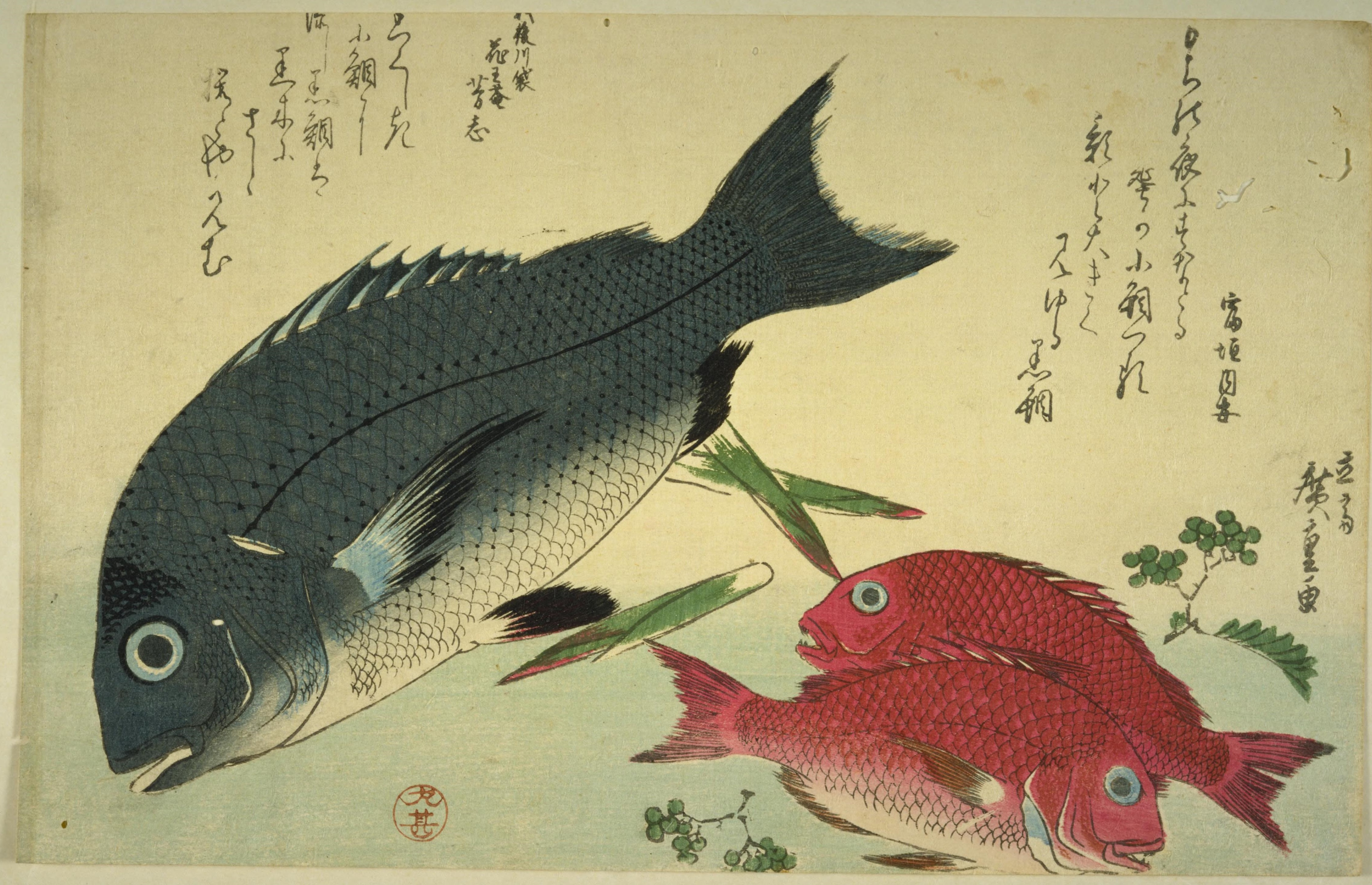
Japanese print by Hiroshige, 1830s. Black seabream (kurodai) is shown on the left

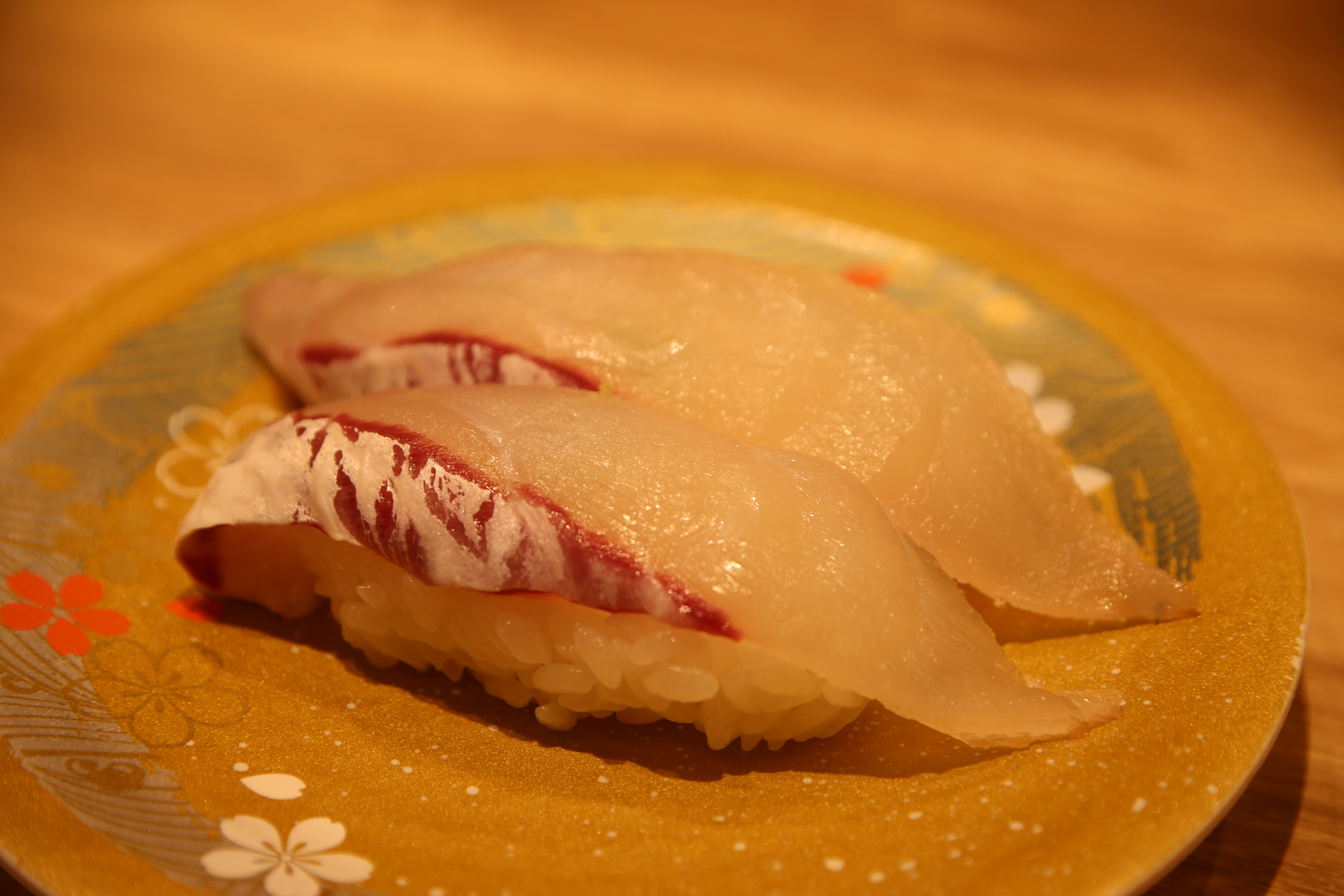
Kurodai as sushi

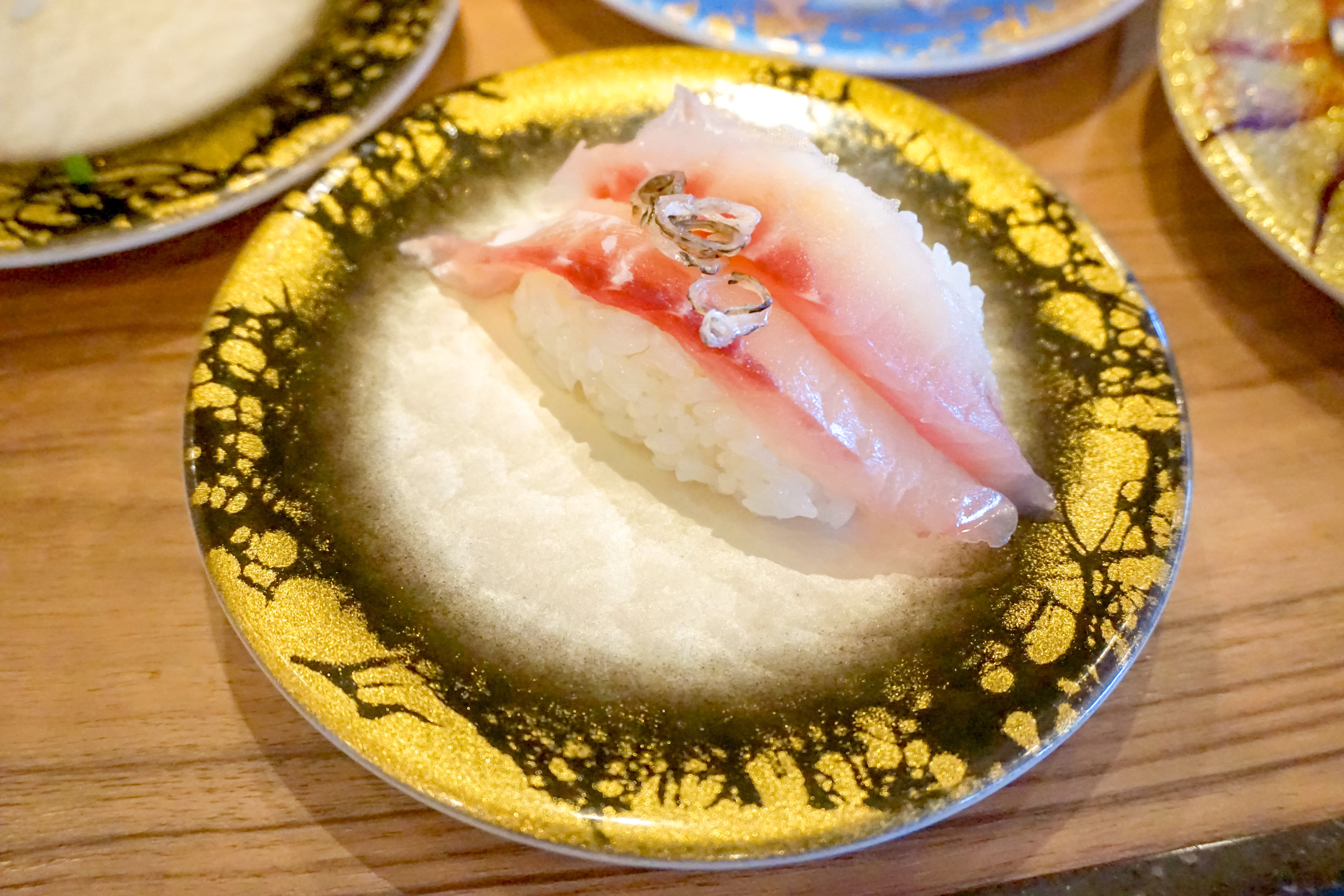
