= Acanthopagrus morrisoni =

Conservation status
- Least Concern (IUCN 3.1)

Scientific classification
- Kingdom: Animalia
- Phylum: Chordata
- Class: Actinopterygii
- Division: Teleostei
- Order: Acanthuriformes
- Family: Sparidae
- Genus: Acanthopagrus
- Species: A. morrisoni

Binomial name
- Acanthopagrus morrisoni Iwatsuki, 2013

Species of fish

Acanthopagrus morrisoni, the western yellowfin seabream, yellow sea bream or datina, is a species of marine ray-finned fish belonging to the family Sparidae, the seabreams and porgies. This fish was previously regarded as conspecific with A. latus but has now been recognised as a separate valid species restricted to the northwestern coasts of Australia.

== Taxonomy ==
Acanthopagrus morrisoni was first formally described in 2013 by the Japanese ichthyologist Yukio Iwatsuki with its type locality given as Hooley Creek in Western Australia. This species was formerly considered as conspecific with A. latus but this taxon was found to be a species complex in 2013 with A. morrisoni being recognised as a valid species within that complex. Some authorities classify the genus Acanthopagrus in the subfamily Sparinae, but the 5th edition of Fishes of the World does not recognise subfamilies within the Sparidae.

== Etymology ==
Acanthopagrus morrisoni has a specific name which honours Sue M. Morrison of the Fish Section in the Department of Aquatic Zoology at the Western Australian Museum. The name should be feminine as morrisinae but the International Code of Zoological Nomenclature 32.5.1 does not allow it to be corrected.

== Description ==
Acanthopagrus morrisoni has 11 spines and 10 to 12 soft rays supporting the dorsal fin and 3 spines and 8 soft rays supporting the anal fin. It has a moderately deep body which has a depth that fits into its standard length between 2 and 2.4 times. The head and body have an overall silvery grey colour with a golden tint and a pale silvery abdomen. There are poorly defined darker streaks along the horizontal lines of the scales. The dorsal fin varies from greyish silver to translucent or dark grey with yellowish tints. The pelvic, anal and caudal fins are transparent and bright yellow with the anal fins having no black streaks near its base on the fin membranes. The pectoral fin are yellowish and have some translucence. They often have an ill-defined blotch at origin and axil of the pectoral fin. This species has a maximum published total length of 45 cm (18 in).

== Distribution and habitat ==
Acanthopagrus morrisoni is found in the eastern Indian Ocean from Shark Bay in Western Australia east to Welpa on the Gulf of Carpentaria in Queensland. It can be found in coastal waters, estuaries and sometimes even enter into freshwaters in rivers close to their mouths. They frequently feed on mudflats. The juveniles hide among mangrioves then move into rocky areas as they mature.

== Biology ==
Acanthopagrus morrisoni preys on crabs, particularly Sesarmidae species, and small gastropods. This species is a protandrous hermaphrodite and in some areas they gather in spawning aggregations. It is a batch spawner and spawning runs from late winter into early spring.

== Fisheries ==
Acanthopagrus morrisoni is an important species for commercial and recreational fisheries in Western Australia. In Shark Bay there is a fishery based out of Denham using beach seines and haul nets to catch four main target species groups, of which the Western yellowfin bream is one. In 2010 this fishery reported a landings totalling 1.5 t (1.5 long tons; 1.7 short tons) and in 2011 this had risen to 9 t (8.9 long tons; 9.9 short tons). The fishery has been given "adequate" status and the fish are targeted when the form breeding aggregations.
