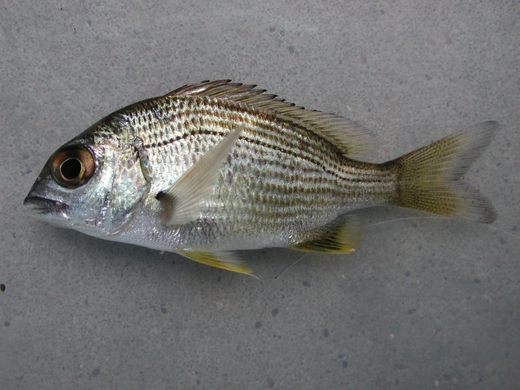

Conservation status
- Least Concern (IUCN 3.1)

Scientific classification
- Kingdom: Animalia
- Phylum: Chordata
- Class: Actinopterygii
- Division: Teleostei
- Order: Acanthuriformes
- Family: Sparidae
- Genus: Acanthopagrus
- Species: A. australis

Binomial name
- Acanthopagrus australis (Günther, 1859)

Synonyms
- Chrysophrys australis Günther, 1859; Mylio australis (Günther, 1859); Pagrus australis (Günther, 1859); Sparus australis (Günther, 1859); Roughleyia australis (Günther, 1859)

= Acanthopagrus australis =

Species of fish

Acanthopagrus australis, the yellowfin bream, also known as sea bream, surf bream, silver bream or eastern black bream, is a species of marine and freshwater fish of the porgy family, Sparidae. It is a deep-bodied fish, occasionally confused with Acanthopagrus butcheri (black bream), but is generally distinguished by its yellowish ventral and anal fins. It is a popular target for recreational fishermen due to its capacity to fight well above its weight coupled with its table quality.

== Taxonomy ==
A. australis is one of 20 species in the genus Acanthopagrus, part of the porgy family Sparidae.

The species was first mentioned in scientific literature by Richard Owen in an 1853 work on skeletal material held by the Museum of the Royal College of Surgeons of England. Although he named it Chrysophrys australis, it was insufficiently described and hence designated a nomen nudum. German-British naturalist Albert Günther formally described the surf bream in 1859 using Owen's name. Allan Riverstone McCulloch classified it in the genus Sparus in 1929. Texts up till 1949 used either of these binomial combinations.

Ian Munro used the binomial name Mylio australis in a 1949 review of the Australian "silver breams", preferring Mylio over Acanthopagrus and Roughleya as he found it to be the oldest valid genus name available. However, the validity of Mylio was questioned as its describer—Philibert Commerson—had listed the type as Sparus mylio.

Munro also found that M. australis was in fact two separate species, creating the new species name of Mylio butcheri to accommodate the southern black bream. Munro based this classification on a number of new specimens,

Acanthopagrus australis has a number of common names, many of which are applied to a number of related fish species, both in Australia and worldwide. It was known as the sea bream or surf bream during the spawning season, while black bream was a common name from New South Wales. In Queensland it was known simply as bream. Munro termed it the yellowfin bream. The Department of the Environment, Water, Heritage and the Arts of the Federal Government designated yellowfin bream as preferred name. It has also been designated the standard name by the CSIRO Division of Marine and Atmospheric Research in commercial fishing in Australia. Its name to the local Eora and Darug inhabitants of the Sydney basin has been transcribed as garuma, karngooma, caroom-a and kururma.

The species has also been known to hybridise with the closely related southern black bream forming viable offspring, themselves able to backcross with the parent species. This is only known from one coastal lake where the two species are landlocked together for extended periods, promoting interbreeding and the production of offspring with morphological traits intermediate between the two species. The setting required to cause hybridisation, however is too rare to consider the two species subspecies, or even a single species.

== Description ==
The yellowfin bream is a slower-growing species than the related black bream, reaching a fork length of 23 cm (9 in) in five years, having matured when 22 cm (8.7 in) long. The colour can be variable: fish caught in freshwater may be bronze- or brown-coloured, while those caught in estuarine or marine habitats are more silvery.

A specimen measuring 56 cm (22 in) long and weighing 7 pounds 3 ounces was caught in the Georges River and reported in 1928, while another even longer specimen from the Clarence River was 58.5 cm (23 in) and 7 pounds 2 ounces.

== Distribution and habitat ==
Yellowfin bream are found along the east coast of Australia from around 19 S to 38 S—roughly from Townsville in northern Queensland to Mallacoota and the Gippsland Lakes region in eastern Victoria. A yellowfin bream specimen was first identified in New Zealand waters in Piwhane / Spirits Bay in 1990, likely introduced by ship dispersal of juvenile fish. Due to the large amount of fishing around Northland and the lack of subsequent specimens, it is unlikely that a population established.

The bream inhabit estuaries in salt or brackish water up to the fresh water limit, and inshore rocky reef habitats near ocean beaches and rocky headlands.

== Breeding ==
Surf bream come downstream to river mouths during spawning season, typically winter, where they spawn and the females lay planktonic eggs. These hatch after a few days, and the young remain in the estuaries. Like other species of sparid fish, the surf bream have a gonad termed the ovotestis that is made up of ovarian tissue dorsally and testicular tissue ventrally, separated by connective tissue. The species is protandrous – male fish become female after the spawning season. The eggs hatch after 2.5 days, after which they spend approximately four weeks as pelagic larvae. Larvae and juvenile fish live exclusively in seagrass beds in shallow estuaries.

== Feeding ==
Carnivorous, the yellowfin bream is demersal, preying on small fishes and invertebrates such as crabs, shellfish, polychaete worms and ascidians that dwell at the bottom of estuaries. They are fond of oysters, and can be found around oyster farms.

== Commercial fishing ==
The species is fished commercially, predominantly in northern New South Wales and southern Queensland, where it is one of the most commonly caught fish. Fish are taken predominantly in autumn and winter in net and mesh traps. Recreational anglers are thought to catch twice as many fish as commercial fishers. Remains of surf bream recovered from middens in New South Wales indicate it was eaten by indigenous Australians.

== Recreational fishing ==
Yellowfin bream are a popular angling species for recreational Australian fishermen. They can be caught in coastal areas and estuaries of New South Wales, Victoria, and Queensland. To protect sustainability of the species, they are subject to legal limits on size and a daily bag limit per angler.

In New South Wales, the minimum legal length is 25 cms, with a daily bag limit of 10 fish per person. In Victoria, the minimum legal length is 28 cms, with a combined daily bag limit of 10 fish across one or more species of bream and tarwhine. In Queensland, yellowfin bream are subject to a combined bag limit of 30 fish shared with pikey bream and tarwhine.

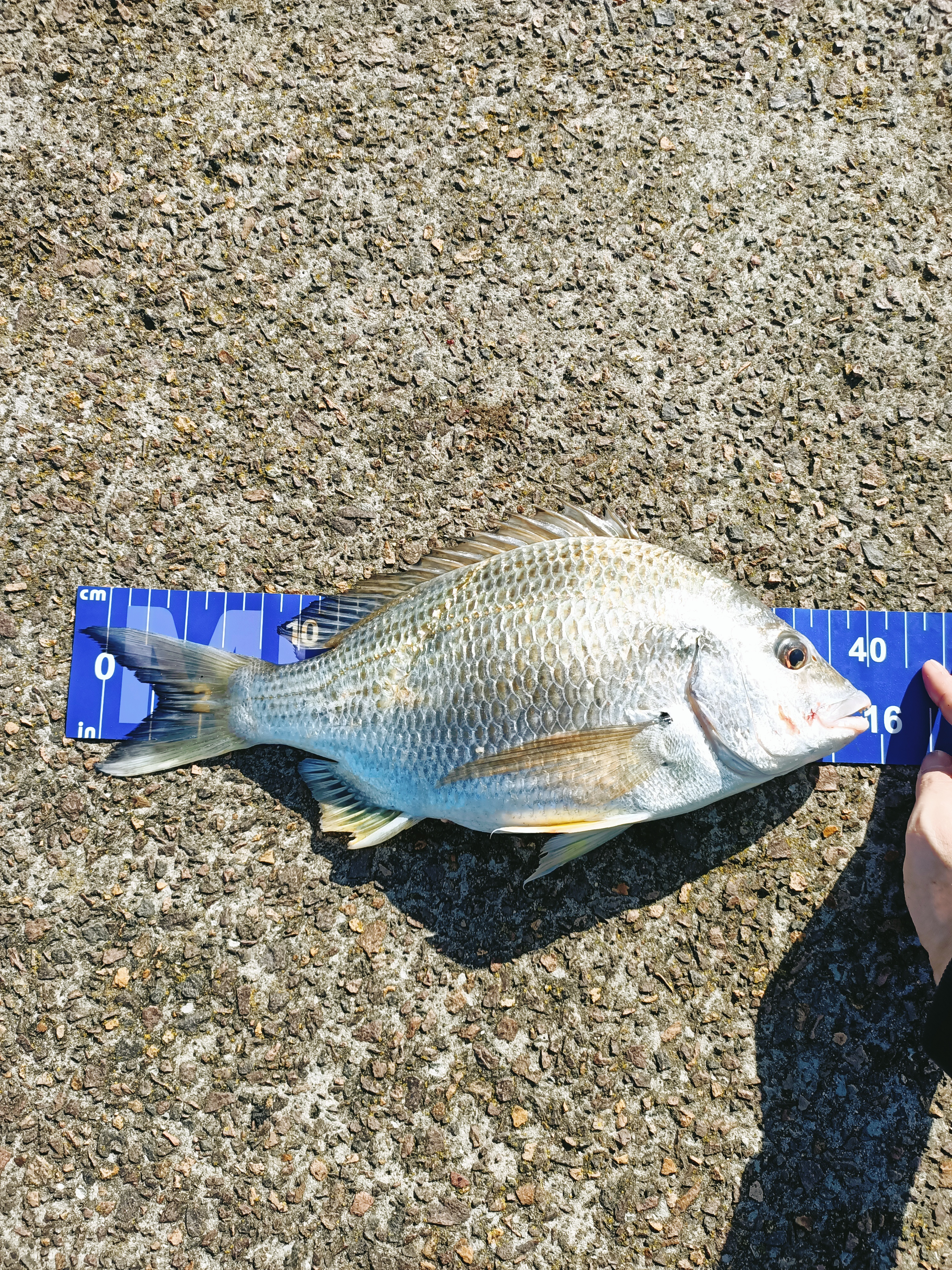
Recreationally caught yellowfin bream in NSW, shown on a measuring mat.
