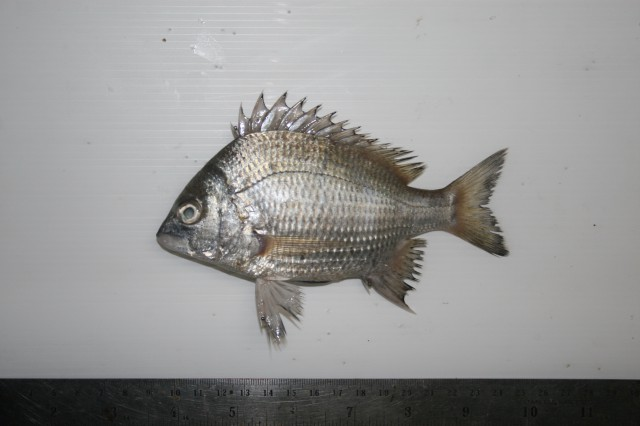
- Acanthopagrus berda (Forsskål, 1775)

Conservation status
- Least Concern (IUCN 3.1)

Scientific classification
- Kingdom: Animalia
- Phylum: Chordata
- Class: Actinopterygii
- Division: Teleostei
- Order: Acanthuriformes
- Family: Sparidae
- Genus: Acanthopagrus
- Species: A. berda

Binomial name
- Acanthopagrus berda (Fabricius, 1775)

Synonyms
- Sparus berda Fabricius, 1775; Chrysophrys berda (Fabricius, 1775); Mylio berda (Fabricius, 1775); Pagrus berda (Fabricius, 1775); Sparus hasta Bloch & Schneider, 1801; Sparus calamara Cuvier, 1829; Chrysophrys calamara Valenciennes, 1830; Acanthopagrus calamara (Valenciennes, 1830); Chrysophrys madagascariensis Valenciennes, 1830; Sparus madagascariensis (Valenciennes, 1830); Chrysophrys berda calamara Day, 1876; Chrysophrys robinsoni Gilchrist & W. W. Thompson, 1908; Pagrus robinsoni (Gilchrist & W. W. Thompson, 1908)

= Acanthopagrus berda =

Species of fish

Acanthopagrus berda, the goldsilk seabream, sly bream, picnic seabream, black sea bream, black porgy, picky bream, silver bream or river bream, is a species of ray-finned fish belonging to the family Sparidae, the sea breams and porgies. This species is found in the Indian Ocean.

== Taxonomy ==
Acanthopargus berda was first formally described as Sparus berda in 1775 by the Danish zoologist Johan Christian Fabricius and published in Descriptiones animalium edited by Carsten Niebuhr. Fabricius based his description on the notes of Peter Forsskål who had died while on an expedition, which Neibuhr was also a member of, to Arabia. The Type locality was given as Al Luhayyah in Yemen. Some authorities classify the genus Acanthopagrus in the subfamily Sparinae, but the 5th edition of Fishes of the World does not recognise subfamilies within the Sparidae.

== Etymology ==
Acanthopagrus berda has the specific name berda, which is the name for this species along the Red Sea coast of Yemen.

== Description ==
Acanthopagrus berda has a relatively deep and compressed body with the depth of its body fitting into its standard length between 2.4 and 2.6 times. The dorsal fin is supported by 11 or 12 spines, while the anal fin has 3 spines, with the second spine being longer than the third, and 8 or 9 soft rays. There are robust molar-like teeth along both jaws, the rows of these teeth are clearly curved laterally at the back of the lower jaw. It is dark olive brown on the upper body, becoming very black when the fish is stressed or excited, much paler on the lower body with metallic tints. This species has a maximum published total length of 90 cm (35 in), although 35 cm (14 in) is more typical.

== Distribution and habitat ==
Acanthopagrus berda is found in the Indian Ocean. It is found along the eastern coast of Africa from the Egypt, Israel and Jordan south to the Eastern Cape of South Africa and Madagascar, east along the Asian coast to Peninsular Malaysia, Singapore and Sumatra. There are claims from freshwater in southern Africa but these are unconfirmed, although it has been recorded in freshwater in Madagascar, and records from the Persian Gulf are thought to be misidentifications of A. randalli. The goldsilk sea bream is dependent on estuaries and is found on areas of sand and mud substrates as deep as 50 m (160 ft). Juveniles and subadults are found in sheltered bays and estuaries.

== Biology ==
Acanthopagrus berda is a predatory species with just over half the prey recorded being crustacea, mainly crabs and barnacles, and bivalves, mussels in the genus Modiolus and oysters. Fish, squid and vegetable matter were also recorded as food items. This species is a protandrous hermaphrodite, with functional males being most numerous in smaller size classes. Adults have ovotestes but may be functionally male or female when spawning. The spawning season for this fish lasts from August to December off Kerala.

== Fisheries ==
Acanthopagrus berda is a popular species for recreational anglers which does not seem to be subjected to heavy fishing pressure. It is fished for by artisanal fisheries in India. This species is being studied for its potential for aquaculture in India.
