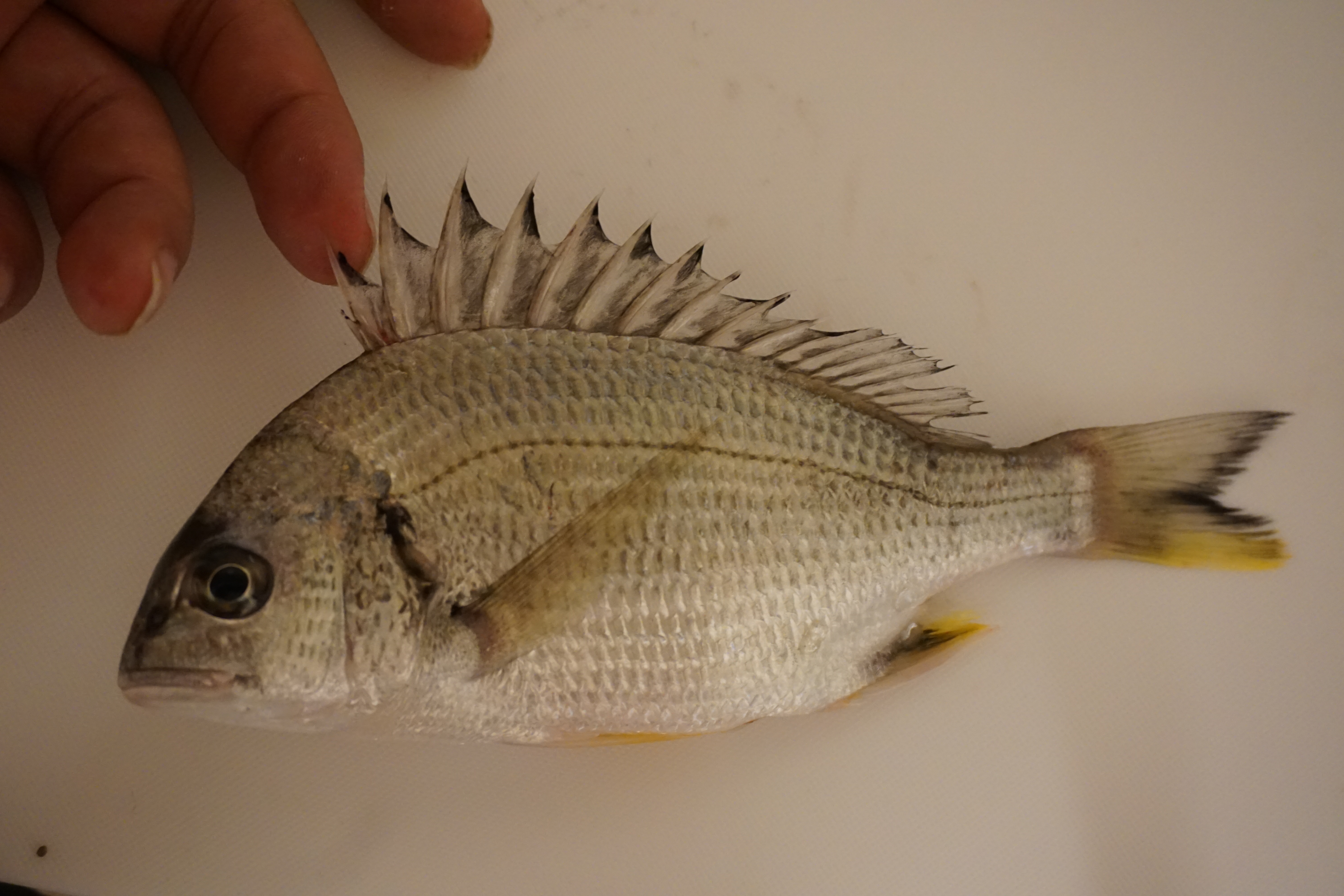

Conservation status
- Data Deficient (IUCN 3.1)

Scientific classification
- Kingdom: Animalia
- Phylum: Chordata
- Class: Actinopterygii
- Division: Teleostei
- Order: Acanthuriformes
- Family: Sparidae
- Genus: Acanthopagrus
- Species: A. latus

Binomial name
- Acanthopagrus latus (Houttuyn, 1782)

Synonyms
- Sparus latus Houttuyn, 1782; Mylio latus (Houttuyn, 1782); Chrysophrys auripes Richardson, 1846; Chrysophrys xanthopoda Richardson, 1846; Chrysophrys novaecaledoniae Castelnau, 1873; Chrysophrys rubroptera Tirant, 1883; Sparus chrysopterus Kishinouye, 1907

= Acanthopagrus latus =

Species of fish

Acanthopagrus latus, the yellowfin seabream, grey bream, Houttuyn's yellowfin seabream, Japanese bream or yellow-finned black porgy, is a species of marine ray-finned fish belonging to the family Sparidae, the seabreams and porgies. This fish is found in the Western Pacific Ocean.

== Taxonomy ==
Acanthopagrus latus was first formally described in 1782 by the Dutch naturalist Martinus Houttuyn with its type locality given as Hirado Bay near Nagasaki in Japan. This species was thought to have a widespread Indo-Pacific range but has now been divided into separate species, A. longispinnis in the Bay of Bengal, A. morrisoni off north-western Australia, A. arabicus in the Persian Gulf and the Arabian Sea and A. sheim in the Persian Gulf and northern Gulf of Oman, with A. latus sensu stricto in the Western Pacific. Some authorities classify the genus Acanthopagrus in the subfamily Sparinae, but the 5th edition of Fishes of the World does not recognise subfamilies within the Sparidae.

== Etymology ==
Acanthopagrus latus has the specific name latus, meaning "broad", Houttuyn described this species as being the widest species in the genus he placed it in Sparus.

== Description ==
Acanthopagrus latus has 10 spines and 10 or 11 soft rays supporting the dorsal fin and 3 spines and 8 or 9 soft rays supporting the anal fin. It has a deep body which has a standard length which is twice its depth. The dorsal profile of the head has a noticeable bulge at the eyes. The overall colour is light grey to whitish, darker on the upperbody and typically being yellowish on the abdomen. There are golden streaks along the horizontal rows of scales and there is an ill-defined dark blotch at the front end lateral line There is a dark band between the eyes and the operculum has a dark margin. The dorsal fin is greyish to hyaline, the pelvic and anal fins are yellowish but may have blackish areas on membranes between the fin rays. The caudal fin has a dark margin, a yellow tinge on the lower lobe. This species has a maximum published total length of 40 cm (16 in).

== Distribution and habitat ==
Acanthopagrus latus occurs in the east Asian shelf area of the Western Pacific Ocean from Honshu, Shikoku and Kyushu in Japan, although it is absent from the Ryukyu and Ogasawara Islands and the Sea of Japan, and southern Korea, Taiwan, along the coast of China from Shanghai as far south as Huế in Vietnam. The yellowfin seabream is found in warm shallow and coastal waters, frequently going into river mouths and estuaries. It occurs at depths down to 50 m (160 ft).

== Biology ==
Acanthopagrus latus feeds in small groups on tidal flats, mainly on benthic invertebrates such as echinoderms, molluscs, worms and crustaceans. At least some individuals are protogynous hermaphrodites but a few may be gonochristic. Off southern China spawning takes place in late winter while off Taiwan it occurs in October. The larvae move into estuaries after hatching.

== Fisheries and aquaculture ==
Acanthopagrus latus is largely caught by artisanal fisheries and the fish landed are sold fresh in markets. It is also used in traditional Chinese medicine. This species has been the subject of attempts at artificial spawning in Taiwan. The larvae and juveniles have also been collected from estuaries to be used to restock habitats and for their aquaculture potential.
