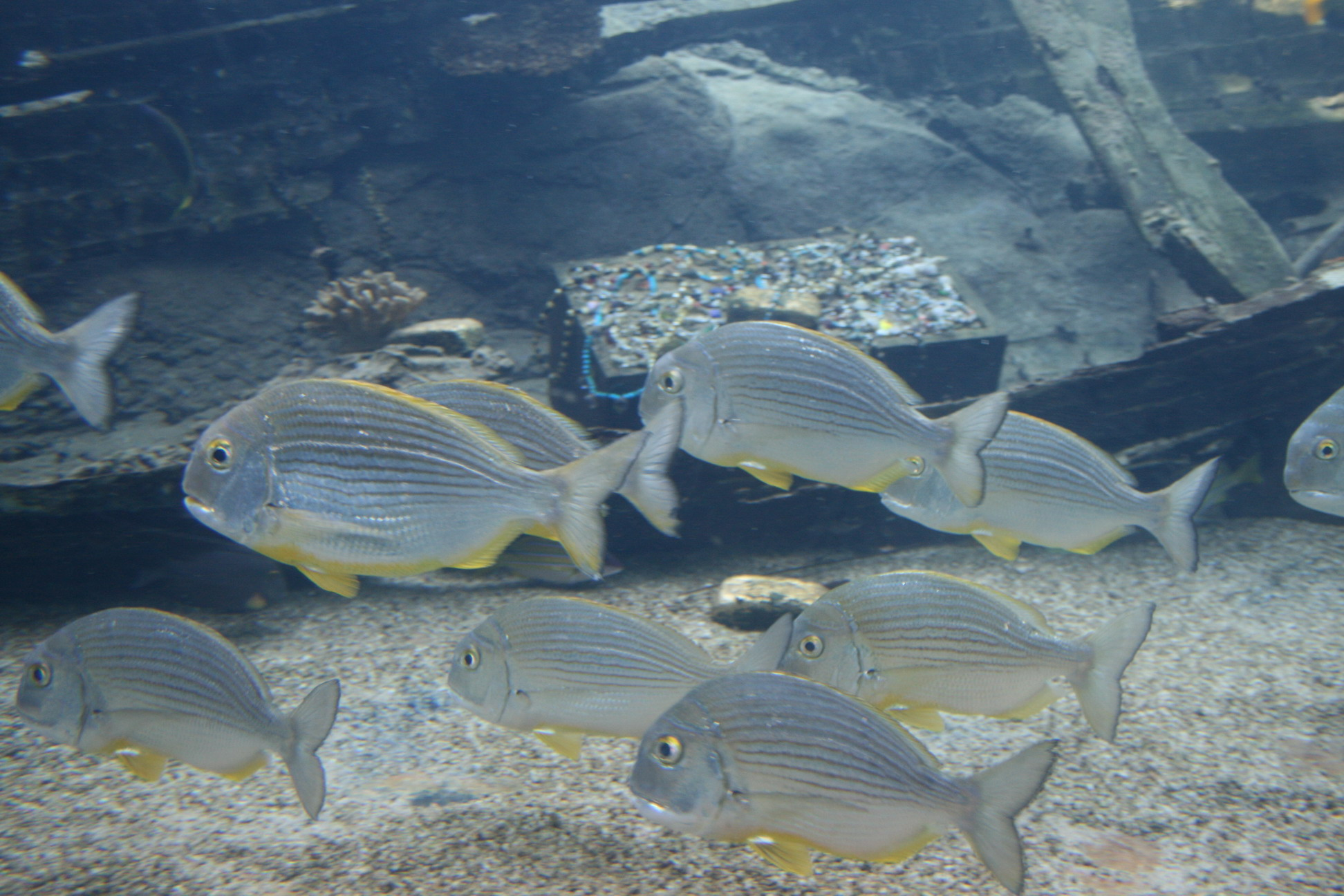

Conservation status
- Least Concern (IUCN 3.1)

- Near Threatened (IUCN 3.1)([

Scientific classification
- Kingdom: Animalia
- Phylum: Chordata
- Class: Actinopterygii
- Order: Acanthuriformes
- Family: Sparidae
- Genus: Rhabdosargus
- Species: R. sarba

Binomial name
- Rhabdosargus sarba (Gmelin (ex Forsskål), 1789)

Synonyms
- List: Sparus sarba Gmelin (ex Forsskål), 1789; Austrosparus sarba (Gmelin (ex Forsskål), 1789); Chrysophrys sarba (Gmelin (ex Forsskål), 1789); Diplodus sarba (Gmelin (ex Forsskål), 1789); Chrysophrys aries Temminck & Schlegel, 1843; Sparus aries Temminck & Schlegel, 1843; Chrysophrys chrysargyra Valenciennes, 1830; Chrysophrys natalensis Castelnau, 1861; Diplodus auriventris Peters, 1855; Rhabdosargus auriventris Peters, 1855; Sargus auriventris Peters, 1855; Sparus bufonites Lacépède, 1802; Sparus natalensis Castelnau, 1861; Sparus psittacus Lacépède, 1802

= Rhabdosargus sarba =

Species of fish

Rhabdosargus sarba, also known as the goldlined seabream, silver bream, tarwhine, or yellowfin bream, is a species of marine ray-finned fish belonging to the family Sparidae, which includes the seabreams and porgies. This fish has a wide Indo-Pacific distribution.

== Taxonomy ==
Rhabdosargus sarba was first formally described as Sparus sarba in 1789 by the German zoologist Johann Friedrich Gmelin from notes written by Peter Forsskål. The type locality was given as Jeddah. In 1855 Wilhelm Peters described a new species Sargus auriventris from Mozambique, in 1933 Henry Weed Fowler classified S. auriventris in the new monospecific genus Rhabdosargus. designating it as its type species. S. auriventris is considered to be a junior synonyms of Gmelin's Sparus sarba. The genus Rhabdosargus is placed in the family Sparidae within the order Spariformes by the 5th edition of Fishes of the World. Some authorities classify this genus in the subfamily Sparinae, but the 5th edition of Fishes of the World does not recognise subfamilies within the Sparidae.

== Etymology ==
Rhabdosargus sarba belongs to the genus Rhabdosargus, a name which is a refixes rhabdos, meaning "stick" or "rod", an allusion to the yellow abdominal band of Sargus auriventris, its type species, to Sargos, a name used for Sparid fish in ancient Greek at least as long ago as Aristotle but in this case is a reference to Sargus as a synonym of Diplodus. The specific name, sarba, is the Arabic name for this species in the Red Sea of Saudi Arabia.

== Description ==
Rhabdosargus sarba has a deep and compressed body, the body has a depth which fits into its standard length 2 to 2.3 times. with a large head. The dorsal profile is convex, most strongly arched between the snout and the origin of the dorsal fin. The moderately sized eyes are relatively smaller in adults. There are 11 spine and 12 or 13 soft rays supporting the dorsal fin while the anal fin is supported by 3 spines and 11 soft rays. The largest molar-like teeth are those at the rear of the third outer row. The overall colour of this fish is greyish with a silvery-gold hue, the ventral surface is silvery-white, and there are thin yellowish to golden horizontal stripes along the flanks. The pelvic and anal fins yellowish to brownish-yellow in colour. This species has a maximum published total length of 80 cm (31 in), although 45 cm (18 in) is more typical, and a maximum published weight of 12 kg (26 lb).

== Distribution and habitat ==
Rhabdosargus sarba has a wide Indo-Pacific distribution from the Red Sea and the eastern coast of Africa as far south as the southern coast of South Africa east across the Indian Ocean and into the Pacific Ocean as far as the South China Sea and Japan and south to Australia. In Australia it is found along the Western Australian coast from Bremer Bay to Exmouth and along the east coast between Townsville, Queensland south to Mallacoota, Victoria. There is a single records from the Mediterranean off Syria, and this is thought likely to have been a Lessepsian migrant from the Red Sea through the Suez Canal. The tarwhine is found at depths between 0 and 60 m (0 and 197 ft), juveniles and young fishes are found in estuaries but the adults move out to deeper coastal waters.

== Biology ==
Rhabdosargus sarba preys on benthic invertebrates, largely molluscs. The goldlined seabream has been found to be a protandrous hermaphrodite off South Africa, Hong Kong and in the Persian Gulf, however, recent studies off Western and Eastern Australia have found it to be a rudimentary hermaphrodite in these waters. These reproductive differences may be evidence that these separate populations may be distinct species and that R, sarba is a species complex. Off South Africa sexual maturity is attained around a total length of 26 cm (10 in) while in Western Australia, it is reached at fork lengths of between 15 and 21 cm (5.9 and 8.3 in). Spawning occurs between July and November off KwaZulu-Natal in inshore waters, near large estuaries and river mouths. Off Western Australia goldlined seabream also spawns between July and November, spawning in batches. The age at when half the fish are sexually mature in KwaZulu-Natal is around 1.8 years and they change sex from male to female at between 1 and 2.5 years old. Goldlined seabreams have been observed moving into deeper, offshore waters to spawn.

== Fisheries ==
Rahbdosargus sabra is an important recreational angling species in Australia, although it is of minor importance as a commercial fishery target in southwestern Australia. In South Africa and Mozambique this species is targeted by artisanal fishers as well as being an important target for recreational anglers. The goldlined seabream has been overfished in the Persian Gulf and the stock has declined so R. sarba has been classified by the International Union for Conservation of Natureas Near Threatened in the Persian Gulf, while being classified as Least Concern globally.
