= Graham Badari =

Aboriginal Australian artist

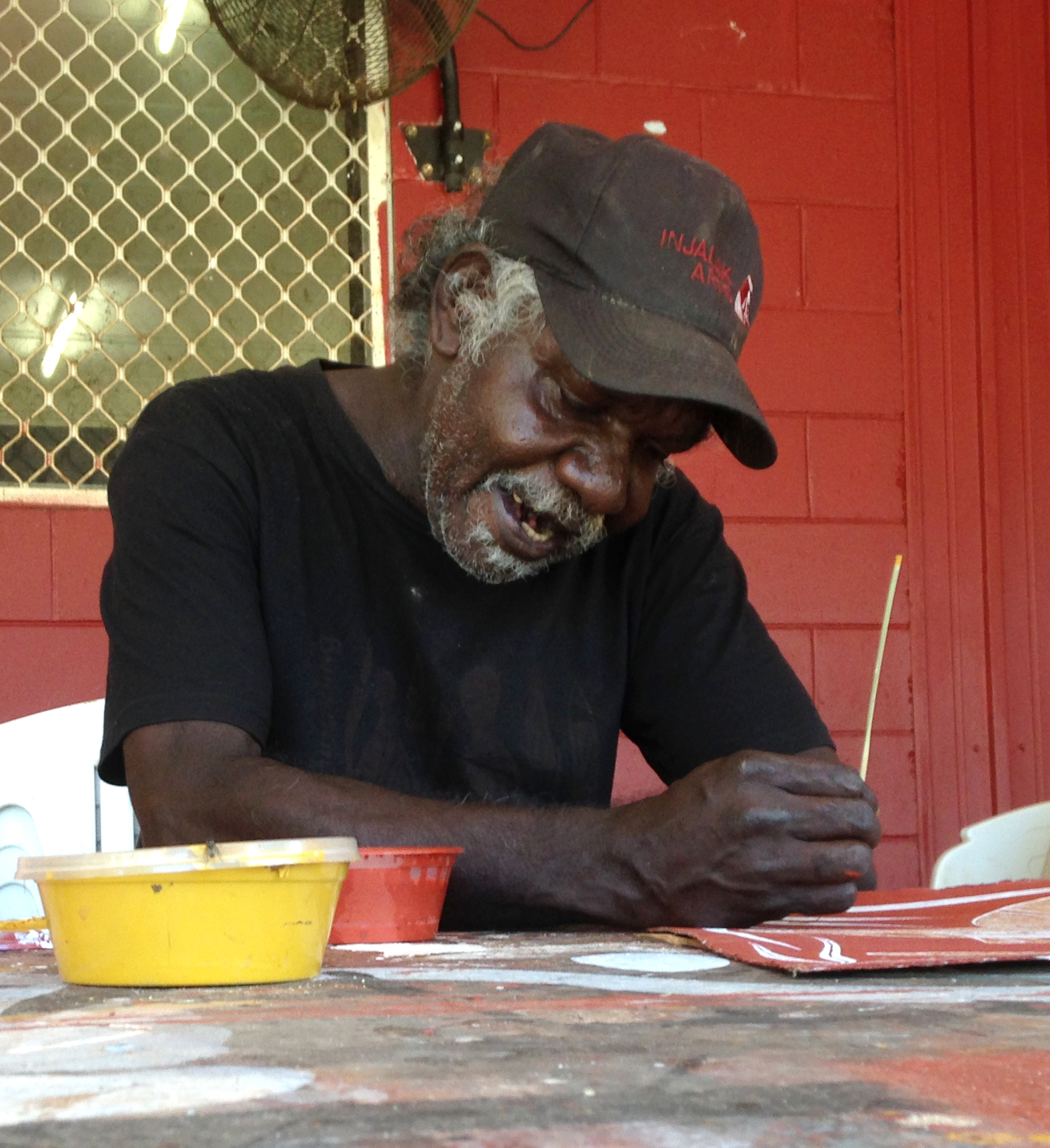
- Born: 20 January 1963 (age 63); Gunbalanya, Northern Territory, Australia
- Organization: Injalak Arts
- Known for: Painting, Contemporary Indigenous Australian art

Graham Badari (born 20 January 1963) is an Aboriginal Australian artist from the Wardjak clan in West Arnhem Land. Graham Badari belongs to the Duwa moeity and speaks the Kunwinjku dialect. At Injalak Arts, Badari is a popular figure, a tour guide, and a font of community news. Art historian Henry Skerritt describes him as possessing a "impish smile and cheeky sense of humour" and a "unique and eccentric personality"

== Biography ==
Graham Badari was born in 1963 in Gunbalanya and raised at Maburrinj, about 75 miles (120 km) east of Gunbalanya. Badari was raised by the renowned Aboriginal Australian artist Djawida Nadjongorle but credits the late Thompson Yulidjirri as his greatest influence. From the senior men at Injalak Arts, Badari would learn the fluid and dynamic figurative style that defined Kunwinjku painting at the art center. In 2011, Badari noted, "I've been painting for a long time. I learned by watching elders."

Badari draws inspiration from many things including his environment as well djang (ancestral creation stories) from both his father and mother country, Djurika. These 'dreamings' inspire his art. He spent a lot of his time there near an outstation of Marmardawerre growing up.

Badari's fascination and fervent belief in the presence of spirit beings are not only expressed in his art but are also an essential part of his cultural heritage. This includes painting malicious spirits but he is also concerned for the safety of people who view his work. He attempts to caution and warn people of the dangers of these spirit beings. Badari is also very aware of the modernization of the world around him. This is evident in his paintings and fashion.

Though he began painting sporadically around 1990, but in recent years, his career has gained a new focus and momentum. Following the passing of many of the senior artists at Gunbalanya, Badari became one of the leaders of a small coterie of dedicated artists, which includes Wilfred Nawirridj, Glenn Namundja, Gabriel Maralngurra, and Gershom Garlngarr. They are constantly present at Injalak Arts and are very proud of their work as well as their community and Injalak Arts Centre. While they stay committed to drawing sacred designs and telling historical knowledge following the rock art tradition, they also have made artistic innovations. Badari's paintings draw influence from the rock art heritages at Injalak Hill, though they occasionally have drawn comparison to imagery of western science fiction and fantasy genres. While a clear connection between his paintings and external influences such as fiction and graphic designs inspired by heavy metal music, Badari refutes these claims and emphasizes the traditional influences and aspects of his paintings. Badari claims that there are no external influences on his artwork, only the traditional stories. Art historian Henry Skerritt characterizes these key elements of Badari's work that make it uniquely his as “this beguiling balance of tensions - innovation and tradition, ancient and modern, beauty and terror- that energize Badari's paintings”. These contrasting elements of Badari's work can shed light on Badari's inspiration for creating art and his unique personality. Badari's attention to detail with his work is unmatched, by painting rarrk, a sacred ceremonial design, he is depicting his cultural heritage.

Along with paintings on paper and bark, Badari has also produced lithographs and etchings, working with master-printmakers including Basil Hall, Andrew Sinclair and Martin King.

== Works ==
In 2009, Badari painted Namarlpe and Kuluban. Namarlpe is the name of the pandanus spirit. This spirit resides in the box pandanus and it is believed that Namarlpe can capture the spirit of an unborn child and keep it trapped in his dilly bag. Kuluban are flying foxes that are a source of food for people in Arnhem Land. These animals are painted in the x-ray style that is characteristic of rock art. In this painting, he is balancing his commitment to ancient rock art and stylistic development.

In 2010, Graham Badari had his first solo exhibition, held at Mossenson Galleries Perth.

More notable paintings include Kinga (Saltwater Crocidile) and Mimi Spirit Hunting. The saltwater crocodile is a highly respected and feared animal that is associated with dreaming sites in Arnhem Land. Mimi's are the original spirit beings that taught Aboriginal people the necessary skills to survive, along with sacred ceremonies, dances, and songs. According to Kunwinjku people, these spirits continue to live in the bush but are hardly seen.

In 2017, as part of a crowdfunding campaign, Graham Badari, Gabriel Maralngurra, and Benson (Isaiah) Nagurrgurrba would produce ethical Flip-flops in partnership with the Fair Trade company, Etiko, created as an alternative to unauthorized designs mimicking the style of Aboriginal artists.

The same year, Badari published the children's book Mayhmayh – Different Birds featuring illustrations of fourteen different birds from Western Arnhem Land alongside text by Felicity Wright. Badari mentioned the name of this books comes from Kunwinjku plural of the word “Mayh” (bird). The artworks in this book feature diverse species of birdlife engaged in their daily activities, with each depiction showcasing the unique qualities and characteristics of the avian subjects. Some of them are selected for inclusion in NATSIA Art Awards.

In 2020, his work Namarrkon (Lightning Man) was a finalist in the Alice Prize. Namarrkon is a highly esteemed ancestral being in the mythology of the Kunwinjku people of Western Arnhem Land, occupies a crucial position in the creation narrative of the region during the Dreamtime. Revered as the Lightning Man, Namarrkon is credited with the creation of thunder by the forceful descent of stone axes upon the earth. These axes are visibly embedded within the joints of his being, while a formidable electric arc envelops his body. Additionally, Namarrkon serves as the guardian of the laws and principles that govern the region, embodying the rich cultural heritage of the Kunwinjku people.

Some of his other most notable works include Mimi Kawarlbun Kunj (Mimi Hunting Kangaroo). Mimi's are mischievous spirits who are believed to possess mystical powers and live forever in the sacred indigenous beliefs. Other famous works are Mamarnde (bad Spirit), Yawk Yawk, Lambalk (Sugar Glider) Warrradjan (pig-nosed turtle), Kulabbarl (billabong), Makkakkurr (pelican), and Ngarrdj (Cockatoo).

In 2022, Badari created Kikkik (Honey Eaters) with the help of a printer. Badari's work in other mediums other than painting on bark includes lithographs. Kikkik (Honey Eater) was printed in two colors from two plates. He achieved this by drawing on the plate in Gunbalanya and then printed by APW Printer Martin King at Australian Print Workshop in Melbourne.

== Preparation for Art ==
Gunbalanya, a community located in West Arnhem Land, Australia, has traditional harvesting techniques for preparing bark paintings. The process involves three main steps: collecting the bark, stripping the bark, and preparing the bark for painting.

The first step in the process is to collect the bark. The ideal time to harvest Eucalyptus tetrodonta, or stringybark, is during the rainy season, known as "kudjewk" by the Kunwinkju people. Young "manbordokorr" trees are sought, and when found, the tree is cut around the bottom at hip height to remove the bark. Sandy soil on the ground is an indicator that the bark may be easily removed. There is no ceremony associated with the removal of bark in Kunwinkju culture, but it is necessary to inform the Ancestors and Traditional Owners whose spirits are connected to that land of the intention to harvest bark.

The second step is to strip the bark. An axe is used to cut around the top of the tree in a zigzag pattern to reach as high as possible while balancing on a fork stick. The selected section's length is cut down, and the bark is loosened by prying it open with the edge of an axe. The fork stick is then removed, and the bark is slowly loosened by leveraging with an axe, stick, and hands until approximately halfway from each side. Finally, the bark is popped off.

The next step is to prepare the fire. After removing the bark, the loose outer bark, or "the back," is stripped off, and firewood is collected. The stripped bark is then placed inside the curled bark, and it is set on fire. Burning the inside of the bark helps to loosen up the saps and resins, causing the bark to soften and relax.

The final step is to fire curl and flatten the bark. The bark is turned over, and the fire is kept going with some wood and bark, but not too hot, to avoid overheating the bark. The bark is heated over the fire for about twenty minutes, moving it around slowly and gently pushing it flat. After heating, two or three heavy bits of timber are placed on the back of the bark, and weight is applied for about an hour. When the group returns home, they trim the jagged edges of the bark and may cut it into smaller pieces if there are any cracks. The bark is then put under some heavy rocks and left to dry for one to two months. Once the bark is dry, a banana knife and sandpaper are used to make it smooth, and the group gathers their ochres and brushes to begin their work.

== Awards ==
- 2023 Finalist, Works on Paper category National Aboriginal and Torres Strait Islanders Art Award, 2023
- 2022 Finalist, Emma Fielden Finalist in National Works on Paper Prize, 2022
- 2020 Finalist The Alice Prize: Contemporary Art Award, 2020
- 2016 Finalist, Works on Bark category National Aboriginal and Torres Strait Islanader Art Award, 2016
- 2015 Finalist, Works on Paper category National Aboriginal and Torres Strait Islander Art Award, 2015
- 2012 Finalist Works on Paper category Aboriginal Torres Strait Islander Art Award, 2012
- 2011 Finalist, Work on Bark category, National Aboriginal Torres Strait Islander Art Award, 2011
- 2010 Works on Bark category National Aboriginal Torres Strait Islander Art Award, 2010
- August 2009 Finalist, 26th National Aboriginal Torres Strait Islander Art Awards Museum and Art Gallery of the Northern Territory Darwin, 2009
- August 2009 Finalist, 26th National Aboriginal Torres Strait Islander Art Awards Museum and Art Gallery of the Northern Territory Darwin, 2009
- 2009 Finalist, Togart Contemporary Art Award (acquired), 2009
- 2009 Winner, Works on Paper category National Aboriginal Torres Strait Islander Art Award, 2009
- August 2008 Finalist 25th National Aboriginal & Torres Strait Islander Art Awards Museum and Art Gallery of the Northern Territory Darwin, 2008
- November 2008; Highly Commended, The Age Melbourne Fringe Festival, 2008
- 2008 Finalist Highly Commended and Acquired National Aboriginal Torres Strait Islander Art Award, 2008
- 2007 FinalistNational Aboriginal Torres Islander Art Award, 2007
- August 2006; Finalist 24th National Aboriginal & Torres Strait Islander Art Awards Museum and Art Gallery of the Northern Territory Darwin, 2006

== Project ==
Australia: Culture Trackers is a cross-cultural residency project held at Mundjurlwurlbinji in western Arnhem Land.

For the Indigenous participants, the project offered a chance to observe, contemporary art practices from outside their communities, build connections with non-Indigenous artist, and share methods and creative ideas. For the non-Indigenous artist, encountering Indigenous individuals, and engaging with Kunwinjku art and culture on ancestral lands proved to be a profound experience that continuously influence their work. A unique agreement was reached between Gabriel Maralngurra and Graham Barari, granting Guan Wei and Peter Walsh permission to incorporate, select iconic motifs. This cultural exchange shaped Wei’s subsequent solo exhibitions, such as Other Histories: Guan Wei’s Fable for a Contemporary World at the Powerhouse Museum and A Distant Land at CACSA.

All of the participating artists produced work from this adventure, which was presented as part of the 2006 Darwin Festival. Nick Mangan continues to exhibit work influenced by the experience, most recently at Buxton Contemporary in Melbourne. The Northern Centre for Contemporary Art served as the exhibition venue, and the project was funded by Australia Council, Darwin Festival, and Northern Territory Government Arts NT.

== Collections ==
Kluge-Ruhe Aboriginal Art Collection of the University of Virginia

National Gallery of Australia

National Gallery of Victoria

Museum and Art Gallery of the Northern Territory

== Personal life ==
Badari is known to be a fan of heavy metal music, with his favorite band being the Swedish power metal band HammerFall. He enjoys western science-fiction and fantasy imagery that he often wears on his t-shirts.

Badari is also a fan of Japanese anime

== Sources ==
- "Graham Badari – Life Forces | Injalak Arts Centre". injalak.com.
