= Injalak Arts =

Aboriginal art centre in Northern Territory, Australia

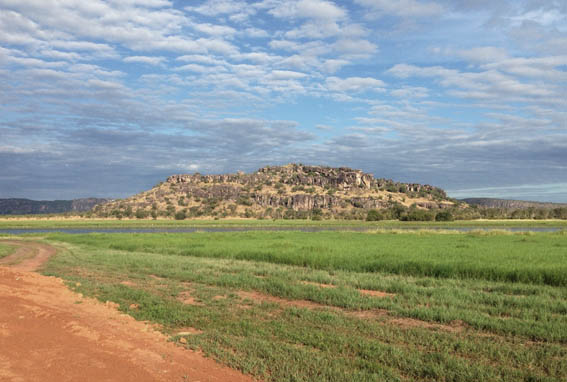
Injalak Hill, about one kilometre from the art centre

Injalak Arts, formerly known as Injalak Arts and Crafts, is a non-profit, community-owned Aboriginal art centre located in Gunbalanya, around 300 km (190 mi) east of Darwin in West Arnhem Land in the Northern Territory of Australia. It was incorporated in 1989. It is known for artists working in a primarily figurative style, and continuing and developing the West Arnhem rock art tradition. It is also known for pandanus weavings. Artists are mostly Kunwinjku people; however, artists from many language groups across Arnhem Land are represented.

== History ==
=== Background ===
The demand for art and artefacts from the Gunbalanya area began long before the incorporation of Injalak Arts and Crafts. Since early European contact, several notable collections were created and much informal trade took place. The anthropologist Baldwin Spencer visited Gunbalanya in 1912 in his role as Special Commissioner for Aboriginals and Chief Protector, staying with Paddy Cahill, the founder of the cattle station in Gunbalanya. He collected many bark paintings and fibre works, and Cahill continued to send him new works for the collection until around 1922. The American-Australian Scientific Expedition to Arnhem Land arrived in Gunbalanya in October 1948, and its leader Charles Mountford commissioned many paintings on bark. However, for him, as for Spencer, these were still ethnographic rather than art objects, a practice "comparable with that of our stone-age ancestors of Europe". Both the year before and the year after the Mountford expedition, the area was visited by the anthropologists Ronald M. and Catherine H. Berndt of the Australian National Research Council, working for Professor A.P. Elkin of Sydney University. They too created a notable collection.

The market for Kunwinjku art began to expand from the late 1950s, largely thanks to major purchases by government institutions. The major collectors included Dorothy Bennett and Dr Scougall for the Art Gallery of New South Wales (1959-1966), the anthropologist Karel Kupka for the Basel Ethnographic Museum (1960), Australian Institute of Aboriginal Studies (1963), Musée national des Arts d'Afrique et d'Océanie (1963), and his private collection (now held at the National Gallery of Australia), as well as Helen Groger-Wurm for the Darwin Museum and the Australian Institute of Aboriginal Studies (1965–70).

From the 1962 to 1974, the Church Mission Society marketed the "art and crafts" of Arnhem Land, selling them through a dedicated outlet in Sydney. The fourth "classic" collection of art from Gunbalanya was gathered mostly through this source, by the Australian Aboriginal Arts Board. By the 1970s, visiting collectors and casual visitors also comprised a ready market for West Arnhem Land art.

Injalak Arts began with a screen printing group started in 1986. In that year, a representative of the Duke of Edinburgh's Award scheme visited Gunbalanya with funding for people to participate. Wendy Kennedy, a teacher who came to Gunbalanya in 1974, had in 1983 accepted a position as adult educator in Gunbalanya. She and a group of her students decided on trying screenprinting for the "hobby" element required by the award. The screenprinter Ray Young was hired to assist, and with the women sewing, they were soon producing printed fabric, bags, calico skirts, baby wraps, nappies, and singlets. A number of the original participants in the Duke of Edinburgh's award, including Gabriel Maralngurra and Donna Nadjamerrek, are still involved in Injalak Arts to the present day, having become leaders within the organisation.

In 1988, the men of the group moved from the adult education centre to a shed near the community council office (the shed later being known as the old CDEP workshop). Around this time, the printers began moving away from generic figurative designs to designs influenced by the traditional style and subject matter of West Arnhem Land art. This raised the attention of elders and traditional custodians of the designs such as Lofty Bardayal Nadjamerrek. But while this could have led to conflict, it slowly developed into a system of cultural protocols around commercial painting still in play at Injalak today.

=== Development of the art centre ===
The screenprinting group caught the attention of the Commonwealth Government's Community Development program, which was keen to promote local business. In 1986–87, discussions and consultations were held about expanding the operations of the group to become an art centre trading a range of artistic media. This was in the context of the rapidly expanding Aboriginal Art movement at the time. In 1988, the screenprinting group successfully applied for $500,000 in funding from the Commonwealth Government, which led to the building of the Injalak Art Centre where is stands today. It was incorporated on 12 April 1989.

Art production picked up quickly following the creation of the new building. Screenprinting and sewing continued, and painting and weaving (primarily pandanus weaving) increased dramatically. Wendy Kennedy stayed on until 1990, before handing over interim management to the screenprinter Ray Young. The first appointed manager, Felicity Wright, arrived in October 1991. Critical in the early days of the art centre was the senior painter Thompson Yulidjirri (d. 2009), who mentored the younger artists and developed Injalak as a place for the transmission of cultural knowledge outside the traditional venues. Felicity Wright stayed on as manager until 1995, a time which saw increasing recognition for Gunbalanya artists. Samuel Namundja won the National Aboriginal & Torres Strait Islander Art Award in the bark painting category in 2006.

A series of managers between 1995 and 2001 included Andrew Headley, Matthew Johnson, Anthony Murphy, and Paul Magin, until Murphy took up the position full-time again in January 2001. Murphy remained as manager until 2010. Lorna Martin arrived in August 2009 and remained as manager until December 2012. In December 2012 Injalak's first manager, Felicity Wright, returned and in 2014 shared managerial responsibilities with Gabriel Maralngurra and Isaiah Nagurrgurrba.

== Description and impact ==
Injalak Arts, located in Gunbalanya, an Aboriginal community of around 1200 people in West Arnhem Land, is an Aboriginal-owned organisation that aims to benefit the community socially, economically, and culturally. The word injalak means "shelter" in the Kunwinjku language.

As of 2024 there are over 200 active members of the art centre, and art is produced year-round. Artists are mostly Kunwinjku people people; however, artists from many language groups across Arnhem Land are represented. While working within the continuous art history of the Arnhem region, Injalak Arts is part of the wider contemporary Aboriginal Art movement, which has made a large impact on the Australian and international art world.

The centre work closely with the Bininj people.

== Cultural tourism ==
Since its inception, Injalak has been involved in cultural tourism, facilitating tours of nearby Injalak Hill. Injalak Hill is an important Aboriginal rock art site located just one kilometre from the art centre across the floodplain, or about a 4-kilometre (2.5 mi) drive via the main roads. Injalak artists have acted as guides of Injalak Hill since the opening of the art centre in 1989. Injalak Hill tours began as informal service, with tourists hiring artists as guides for rates often organised on the day. In 1992, a five-year plan for the art centre was formulated, with the Aboriginal governing body of Injalak expressing the desire to formally promote cultural tourism. The main reasons highlighted were to facilitate the understanding of Kunwinjku art and culture, and to generate work and income.

As demand increased, tourists began to book in advance, and eventually by the dry season of 2000, about 10-15 tours were leaving the art centre for Injalak Hill each week. The walking tour normally lasts 2.5 to 3 hours.

== Artists ==
Artists associated with the centre include:

- Graham Badari
- Gabriel Maralngurra
- Glen Namundja
- Ezariah Kelly
- Joey Nganjmirra
- Joe Guymala
- Maath Maralngurra
- Alicia Mardday
- Anne Gumurdul
- Isaiah Nagurrgurrba
- Garry Djorlom
- Don Namundja
- Jill Nganjmirra
- Lawrence Nganjmirra
- Thommo Nganjmirra

Notable deceased artists associated with the centre include:

- England Banggala
- Peter Nabarlambal
- Bardayal 'Lofty' Nadjamerrek
- Jimmy Kalariya Namarnyilk
- Bobby Nganjmirra
- Robin Nganjmirra
- Thompson Yulidjirri
- Ganbaladj Nabegeyo
- Wanurr Bob Namundja

== Media ==
Artists work within a range of media, prescribed by tradition and subsequent new media fostered by the art centre.

- Bark painting in both ochres and acrylics
- Paintings on Arches paper in both ochres and acrylics
- Etchings
- Fibres
- Woven, knotted and coiled works from pandanus, including baskets, mats, dilly bags and sculptural works
- Knotted fibre bags, made from kurrajong bark and Livistona humilis palm leaves
- Mako (Didgeridoos)
- Items of traditional culture such as Clapsticks, spear throwers and spears
- Screen printed fabrics
- Carvings, including Mimih Spirit carvings
- Jewellery items such as earrings and necklaces, made using pandanus, seeds (commonly Adenanthera pavonina) and sometimes bones.

== Access ==
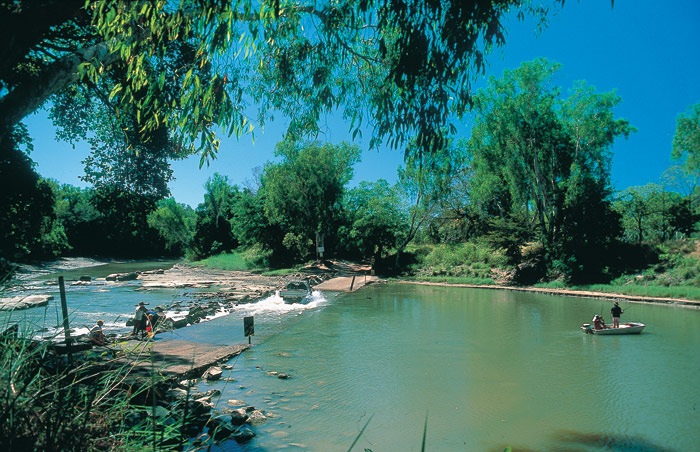
Visitors coming via road need to cross the East Alligator River at Cahill's Crossing

Visitors are required to acquire a permit from the Northern Land Council in Jabiru or Darwin to enter Arnhem Land. For day visitors, these permits are generally issued on the spot. However the offices are closed on weekends so visitors may need to plan ahead. Occasionally weather conditions, ceremonial events or funerals may result in permits not being issued, so visitors are advised to contact the Northern Land Council in advance.

The art centre is around 50 minutes by road from Jabiru. Visitors are free to travel to the art centre via private vehicle (4WD recommended, but also accessible by ordinary car). The accessibility of Gunbalanya via road is determined by the level and flow of the East Alligator River. Cahill's Crossing, about 16 km (9.9 mi) from Gunbalanya, is affected by tides and seasons; there is an online tool to check the height of the tide.

Gunbalanya also has a sealed all-weather airstrip, Oenpelli Airport, and charter flights are available from Jabiru year-round. Gunbalanya Air Charters also provides transport between the airport and the town in both Gunbalanya and Jabiru.

== Further viewing ==
- Cracking the Colour Code: A visual exploration of how we view colours, how we make them, and the meanings they hold in our world, dir. Hugh Piper, Electric Pictures and Gedeon Programmes, in assoc. SBS Television, Arte France et al., 2008.
- Knowledge, Painting and Country, dir. Andrea & Peter Highlands, Creative Cowboy Films, 2011
- Rock Art and Yingana: A walk up Injalak Hill, dir. Andrea & Peter Highlands, Creative Cowboy Films, 2011
- The brush sings: Injalak – an aboriginal art centre, dir. Andrea & Peter Highlands, Creative Cowboy Films, 2011
