= Bobby Nganjmirra =

Bobby Barrdjaray Nganjmirra
- Born: c.1915 Marlwon, Northern Territory, Australia
- Died: 1997; Gunbalanya, Northern Territory, Australia

Bobby Barrdjaray Nganjmirra (c. 1915–1992) was a Kunwinjku Aboriginal artist of the Djalama clan and Yirridjdja moiety.

== Life ==
He was born around 1915 at Malworn, between the Gumaderr and Liverpool Rivers, in West Arnhem Land, growing up primarily in a traditional lifestyle despite short periods spent at school in Gunbalanya and on Goulburn Island. Around the time he was 19-20 he went to Warruwi to marry Mary Lilinjdji of the Duwa moiety. He worked at the Oenpelli Mission alongside other artists in the 1960’s. In this time, his bark paintings were being collected by anthropologist Dorothy Bennett.

He is amongst the best known of the early modern Kunwinjku bark painters and was a contemporary of artists such as Bardayal 'Lofty' Nadjamerrek and Yirawala. In a 2008 Sydney auction hosted by Bill Evans, one of Bobby's traditionally renditioned bark paintings attracted a sale of $2186. Stylistically, he painted in a more traditional style and favored the use of cross-hatching or rarrk. As he became more developed and respected as an artist he began teaching younger generations, including his nephew Robin and Bruce Nabekeyo who both went on to elaborate upon the use of rarrk.

== Family ==
Bobby's father is Kurlamarrmarr. Their whole family is involved in the art scene of Gunbalanya. He learned how to paint from his father, who first taught him to paint a kangaroo on Injalak Hill in 1930. His brothers Jimmy Nakkurridjdjilmi Nganjmirra and Peter Nganjmirra were also well-known artists, and their sons and grandsons together form an important artistic dynasty within western Kunwinjku art. Many still paint for Injalak Arts in Gunbalanya. Barrdjaray is also said to have mentioned that he was related to Ancestral creator of the Mardayin ceremony, Luma Luma, and called him "grandfather." Luma Luma is the ancestor who imparted all sacred objects and rarrk designs to distinct clans. Bobby has two great-grandchildren, Eva and Lawrence Nganjmirra, who continue the artist's legacy.

== Career ==
Bobby Nganjmirra started his career in painting through his paintings on Injalak Hill throughout his upbringing and adulthood. He is considered to be one of the most recent elders to have painted traditional motifs on Injalak Hill in 1984 along with the most recent artist Thompson Yulidjirri in 2003.

Nganjmirra was a foundational figure for the Injalak Arts centre. During his association with Dorothy Bennett and discussion of the Kluge-Ruhe commission, Nganjmirra decided to endorse the major step to incorporate the introduction of paper into the art centre. This, in turn, facilitated Aboriginal artwork to become modernized while still maintaining traditional ideas on a different medium. The transition to paper also allowed for newer artists to paint smaller subject matter and ideas of Nganjmirra's larger artworks. One of the first major works on paper at Injalak Arts is that of Bobby Nganjmirra and Alexandar Nganjmirra, Luma Luma, The Giant of the Dreamtime: Goanna and the Crocodile Sequence.

== Legacy ==
Nganjmirra is one in only a handful of artists who received individual attention towards his life details within publications and exhibitions. Following his death, Bobby Nganjmirra was known for some time by his skin name Nawakadj, and a large monograph of his work and stories Kunwinjku Spirit: Nawakadj Nganjmirra, Artist and Storyteller was published with this name. The book features paintings, drawings, and stories about the creation ancestors. This book also contained works from his extended family. Copies of this book were printed in Kunwinjku and English, providing a rich opportunity for the study of language and culture. The book features photography by Neil McLeod. In addition, Nganjmirra's bark paintings significantly fostered the understanding of the Kunwinjku language. Nganjmirra is acknowledged in Peter John Carroll's thesis, Kunwinjku: A Language of Western Arnhem Land, through the stories relayed and interpreted through his bark paintings.

== Studies In Disappearing Contact Era Rocks ==
His rock painting with a red and white kangaroo on Injalak Hill is part of this study. The authors looked at multiple points over time in the evolution of the painting. An example is shown from 1985 & 2019 as a demonstration of how these paintings are vanishing. The researchers came to the conclusion that removing tree canopies that are adjacent to the rocks will cause an increased rate of deterioration. They also stated that human choice and increased tropical storms due to climate change have impacted the paintings.

== Collections ==
- National Gallery of Victoria
  - 2 of his paintings are at the National Gallery of Victoria Manwuriwuri Corroboree (1969) and Mimih Spirits (1988)
- Injalak Hill
  - Bobby Nganjmirra is specifically credited for his 1930 kangaroo painting and others in 1984.
- National Gallery Australia
  - The National Gallery Australia has 31 works credited to Nganjimirra. Common themes of these works include Kunwinjku people, stories from Nimbuwa Rock, Mimih figures, and images of crocodiles.
