= Gabriel Maralngurra =

Aboriginal Australian artist

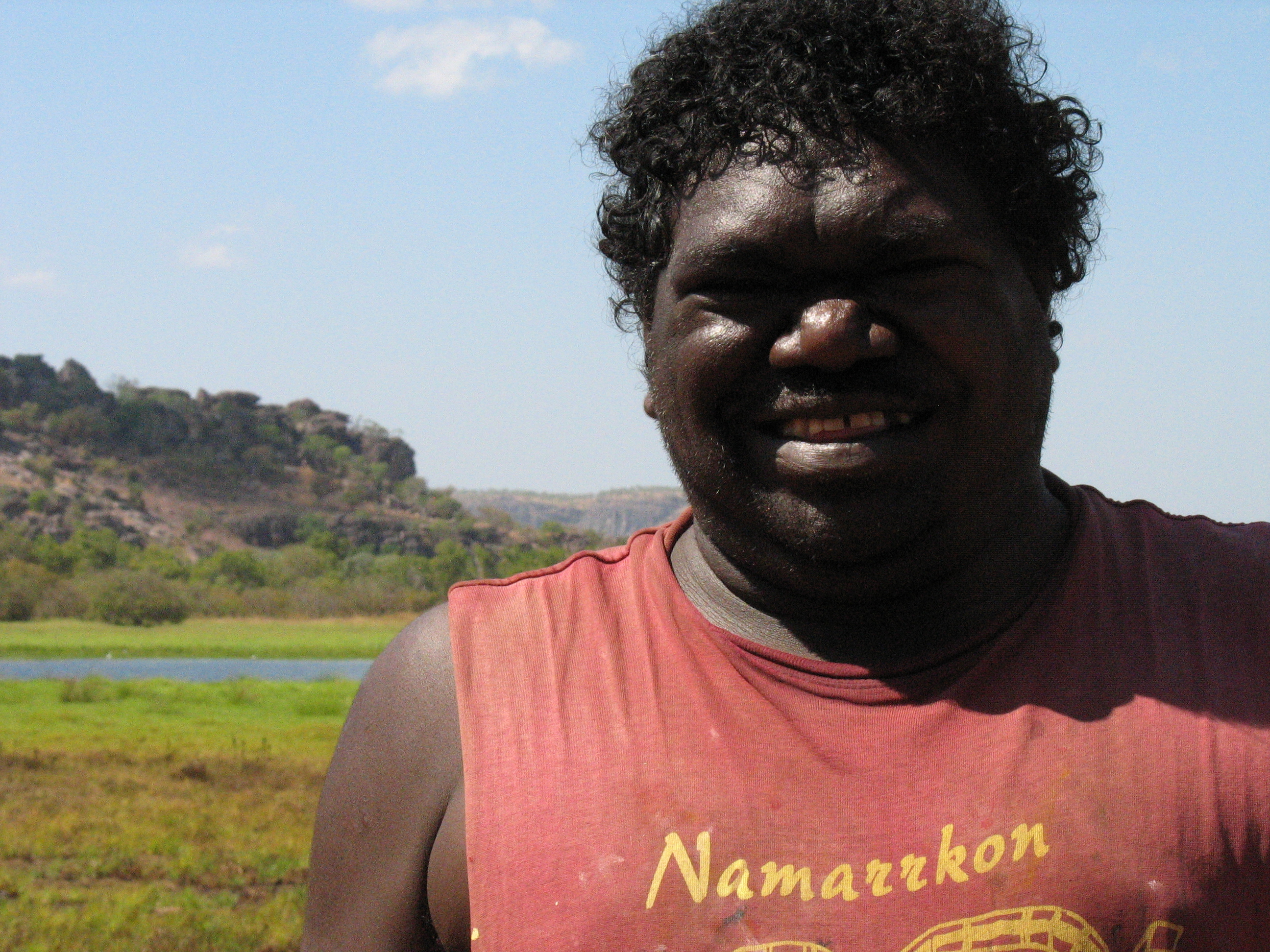
- Born: 18 July 1968; Gunbalanya, Northern Territory, Australia
- Died: 26 February 2025 (aged 56)
- Organization: Injalak Arts
- Known for: Painting, Contemporary Indigenous Australian art
- Spouse: June Nadjamerrek
- Children: 2
- Parent(s): William Maralngurra, Dolly Maralngurra

Gabriel Maralngurra, also known by his clan name Nawakadj Ngalangbali, (1968-2025) was a leading Kunwinjku speaking artist, author, and researcher in West Arnhem Land, Australia. As an Aboriginal artist, he was well-known and respected within his community for the wide range of responsibilities he took on, especially mentoring new generations of artists at the local art centre, Injalak Arts. His artwork is displayed in various collections including the Australian Museum, Museum Victoria, and the Kluge-Ruhe Aboriginal Art Collection of the University of Virginia. Maralngurra’s paintings have been cited in global archaeological discourse as active interventions that assert Indigenous agency and reinterpret colonial histories through art.

== Early life ==
Born 18 July 1968 and raised in Kunbarlanja, Maralngurra was the oldest of seven children, born to William and Dolly Maralngurra. Maralngurra belonged to the Yirridjdja moiety and the Ngalangbali clan. He was from the community of Oenpelli (now known as Gunbalanya). Maralngurra's entry into Aboriginal art began through the guidance of his uncle, Thompson Yulidjirri. During his childhood, Yulidjirri brought him to witness the rock paintings on Injalak Hill. This exposure sparked Maralngurra's artistic inspiration, drawing from the richly adorned rock art galleries throughout western Arnhem Land.

In Aboriginal Australian cultures, Dreaming is the word used to explain the origin of life, cultural values, and law of the regions. To Aboriginal peoples, it represents the time when the accessorial spirits progressed over their land and gave it life. As a young boy, Gabriel recalls first being educated about dreaming by his father with the story about the Two Brothers. It is these stories that have been passed down through cultural traditions of body painting, storytelling, song and dance from his ancestry that had great influence on his art.

== Career ==
Maralngurra is known for working with ochre on paper, as well as keeping the traditional forms of rock art, while combining new innovative techniques. Since he began painting, his artistic practice has been characterised by the breadth and depth of subjects, as well as fluent linework and highly original compositions. The purpose of many of his paintings are to draw the attention of non-Indigenous viewers who do not understand or even realise his culture exists. The artistic style of the Kunwinjku people from Western Arnhem Land retains a strong influence from the traditional rock art of the area. It is reimagined thematically as a narrative that encompasses a blend of "intense emotions like yearning, passion, supernatural elements, and retribution." With Maralngurra's artwork, he aimed to ensure that the tradition and practice of painting in the Arnhem Land is not lost, but passed down to the younger generations. Maralngurra was one of the key informants used to interpret a major rock art panel depicting a Ubarr (Wubarr) ceremony, helping scholars distinguish the processes and meanings of the ritual, including the identification of moiety-specific roles and sacred elements. Maralngurra stated that in some rock paintings from Injalak Hill, the use of red and yellow figures symbolically represents Duwa and Yirritja moieties, revealing how traditional social structures are represented in visual form. Through these interpretations, Maralngurra preserved knowledge of sacred ceremonies, like the Ubarr, which are no longer commonly practiced. As an artist, his artistic oeuvre covered a diverse range of subjects, spanning depictions of ancestral stories, flora and fauna, as well as scenes portraying the initial interactions between colonisers and Aboriginal people. In these works, Maralngurra would sometimes deliberately include historical inaccuracies. For example, depicting Spencer with his wife and a car that wouldn’t arrive in the region for over a decade. This asserts his work as a historical narrative instead of a documentary account. In Sir Baldwin Spencer (2003), Maralngurra portrayed the anthropologist with x-ray style, which was traditionally reserved for animals or spirits. When asked about this choice, he explained, “He can see right through him, that clever man,” implying a symbolic switch of the human gaze. In doing this, Maralngurra employed innovative techniques when passing down stories, traditions, and practices of his culture in the Arnhem Land. He did this through expressing his relationship with the natural world.

One of Maralngurra's most notable achievements included being one of the founding members of Injalak Arts in the 1980s. Maralngurra was the artist who suggested naming the arts center “Injalak Arts” after the nearby Injalak Hill, a site known for its rock art dating back over 40,000 years, and one of his main sources of inspiration. Injalak Hill remains a centre for tourism due to its decorated rock art imagery from over thousands of year ago. During the "contact" period, artists persisted in creating rock art despite growing encroachments on their territories, diseases, and conflicts on the frontier. Nestled in a remote rock shelter on Injalak Hill, a specific rock painting narrates a unique tale of cultural interaction. Dubbed by Aboriginal traditional owners as the "Buffaroo", it likely blends a traditional motif - the kunj or kangaroo - with a recently introduced creature - the nganaparru or water buffalo. This life-sized painting of the "Buffaroo" likely represents a period of experimentation for the Aboriginal artists as they familiarised themselves with depicting a newly introduced animal in that region.

An important Kunwinjku artist from Oenpelli in Western Arnhem Land, Gabriel Maralngurra has also played a very important role in the Indigenous textile arts movement. Using his position at Injalak Arts, Maralngurra has been extremely vital in the fusion of traditional Kunwinjku designs into modern textile practices. His involvement in the 2012 “Travelling with Yarns” forum in Gunbalanya highlighted his devotion to seeing new areas of Indigenous fabric printing, including aspects from the digital world, all while keeping his culture the same. The forum was used to bring Indigenous artists, designers, and other experts together to talk about the future of Aboriginal textile arts.

His work extends beyond the textile industry, as his paintings come from many ancestral narratives, local flora and fauna, and major historical events, reflecting his mindset which is deeply rooted to Indigenous culture. His art is hugely impacted by traditional motifs and contemporary modes, showing the ever-changing nature of Indigenous art. Maralngurra’s efforts have been nationally and internationally respected, as his works held in the Kuge-Ruhe Aboriginal Art Collection, the National Museum of Australia, and the British Museum have all been held in high regard. Through his work at Injalak Arts, Maralngurra continues to preserve and promote Kunwinjku culture.

It is these traditional rock art paintings that continued to inspire Maralngurra's paintings. His artworks often illustrated local fauna, spirit figures such as the Mimih spirit, and Dreaming narratives (or djang). However, he always found a way to add his own narrative flair and eternal coherence that is unique to art in the Arnhem Land.

Gabriel Maralngurra’s work in the Aboriginal art field extends beyond his artworks; he is also a translator, artistic mentor, tour guide, and co-researcher in the worlds of Aboriginal and colonial history. As the founding member and co-manager of Injalak Arts, he has been an important part in the development of Indigenous art and preservation of his culture in western Arnhem Land. His involvement in these affairs, including his commitment to the traditional and artistic sides of his community show just how important his culture’s heritage is to him.

In the 2024 publication "Aboriginal Rock Art and the Telling of History," Maralngurra's work is featured prominently, highlighting his integration of history, archaeology, and Indigenous artistic practice. The book presents his artwork as a means of challenging traditional academic narratives, demonstrating how history has been literally painted 'on the rocks.' By showcasing Maralngurra's art, the publication offers new insights into the medium of rock art and emphasizes the limitations of conventional methods in understanding and conveying the past.

Maralngurra’s work plays an important role in the field of contact rock art. His paintings show the shifting dynamics and asymmetrical power relations that are hidden within these interactions, not just from recording contact with colonial groups but also through the interpretation of it through Kunwinjku eyes. Maralngurra’s artworks and pieces, which are filled with ancestral knowledge, ceremonial motifs, and purposeful historic twists, emphasize Indigenous action in framing these narratives. His depictions move beyond passive representation and mere beauty, but become a medium through which culture, resistance, and self-identity can be shared.

Scholars have explained how contact rock art, including Maralngurra’s paintings, challenge the traditional colonial idea of “first encounters” by incorporating these moments into a larger scale of cultural exchange. As one of the few artists who are known for their direct link with contemporary contact art practices in Arnhem Land, Maralngurra’s work plays an important role in being the bridge between ancient art traditions and modern historical records. His contribution reaches the globe, as it helped Australian contact art position itself next to similar traditions in Africa and the Americas. It also reshaped the archaeological and anthropological approaches to Indigenous history. Through the unique Aboriginal way of visual storytelling, Maralngurra confirms the depth and continuity of Aboriginal culture and traditions, while going against the colonial perspectives that once sought to define it.

Gabriel Maralngurra explained that Aboriginal people used message sticks to send messages about ceremonies and trade. Message sticks are a type of carved wood. These sticks were a traditional way of sharing information, even before Europeans arrived. Maralngurra believed this was already a form of writing. He says his relative, Narlim, treated the rock wall like a blackboard. Narlim painted animals, hand stencils, and English words like “pig”, “cat”, and “Darwin” to help teach others. Narlim created a new way of teaching by combining Aboriginal knowledge with Western literacy by mixing traditional images with English writing.

This innovative mimicking of rock art has been referred to as "rock art style" and is intended to combine the ancient aspects of rock art with new techniques, such as printing on paper and the use of Reckitt blue. This innovation steamed both from Maralngurra's desire to innovate and keep the cultural stories that had been handed down to him by the Old People.

Gabriel Maralngurra used Reckitt’s Blue pigment in his own paintings and said it was “smooth and nice to paint with”. He also explained that blue, unlike red and yellow, which were typically linked to moiety society, did not have any cultural rules. This allowed artists to use Reckitt Blue freely after missionaries brought it to their community.

He attributed most of his painting education to his elder, Thompson Yulidjirri, who has always played an important role in the teaching of younger generations. Another influential mentor was his father-in-law, the late Mok artist Baradayl ‘Lofty’ Nadjamerrek. He picked up on many of his painting techniques such as the x-ray and rarrk (cross-hatching) technique from them, and they taught Maralngurra how to combine traditional and non-traditional techniques to empower their communities.

Maralngurra's artwork draws inspiration from ancient rock paintings in the area and this is how he incorporated painting techniques like x-ray and rarrk. His paintings often included hunting and cooking methods of different animals. By depicting different animals like pythons, spoonbills, echidna, turtles, and knob-tailed geckos. In painting these animals, Maralngurra highlights the cultural nuances of how various groups view these animals, and how different moiety relates to them, for example noting that while Dhuwa people refrain from consuming borlokko (python), Yirritja people do not have these same restrictions. Gabriel uses the depiction of Burarr (water goanna), and talks about how it originates from the waterholes of the Dhuwa moiety. He continues to explain that they MUST catch, cook, and eat the Burarr or else it could bring bad luck from their ancestors. The Burarr is depicted as an x-ray piece, which allows the viewer to see the internal organs. Namarrkon (the lightning man) is another spirit that is depicted and indicates the arrival of the wet season. This spirit brings bad storms but when they hear the thunder they know that there is going to be an abundance of fish for them to eat. Similarly the file snake with eggs is an indication that the dry season is among them. This is when it is safest for them to collect the eggs from the water, the eggs being untouched indicates that there are less crocodiles roaming in the waters. In one of his pieces Gabriel depicts the Ngalkkunburriyaymi(water spirit), Ngalangball skin, and Yawkyawk (female water spirit). He describes what different skins are and how they can be used as marriage categories, stating that they have different interpretations in the Eastern and Western Arnhem land systems. It can also be used to specify patri-clans, which is the djang each person is allowed to represent. Each clan has a designated area of the country which is their Kunred.

Before the construction of Injalak Hill, Gabriel and 4 other young men asked Wendy Kennedy an adult educator, if there was anything they could do. Because Kennedy saw the potential of these young men, a screen printing facility was established. Combined with the sewing skills of women they created an enterprise in which both men and women could work. Gabriel printed a t-shirt and presented it to the Duke of Edinburg, which eventually led to a grant from the Aboriginal Development Corporation, leading to the construction of Injalak Hill. Gabriel, Isaiah Nagurrgurrba, and Neville Narmaryilk worked the printing tables at Injalak, and this led to creation of the Barramundi. Gabriel and Jill Nganjmirra express the appreciation of dilly baskets and connect the use to the Barramundi. The dilly baskets are used in the Manmoro ceremony in which boys and girls celebrate their first catch of a Barramundi, and then use the bag as a way to carry the bones, which serves as their prize.

In 1995, Gabriel Maralngurra traveled to Shanghai, China, to represent Injalak Arts at an exhibition organized by the Australian Department of Foreign Affairs and Trade. This event included paintings from the Injalak Arts Centre and presented Kunwinjku art to an international audience. Maralngurra represented the art centre, contributing to cultural exchange efforts and promoting awareness of Western Arnhem Land art practices.

=== Contact paintings ===
Between 2004 and 2007 Maralngurra produced a series of "contact paintings" exploring colonial events such as the arrival of anthropologists and missionaries to Gunbalanya. These pieces exhibit the coming together of different cultures and recognise the differences between each other's communities. Although seemingly different, this still followed Maralngurra's tendency to use art as a way of educating others and fill the gap between different communities, especially non-Aboriginal people. Specifically, in this series of paintings, he focuses on depicting Baldwin Spencer, who was the first anthropologist to visit the region of the Western Arnhem Land. Spencer and Mountford (a cohort of Spencer), viewed the Indigenous people as if they were living in "an earlier stage of human development." But they respected the traditional art that indigenous people created and viewed it as brilliant. In 2003, Maralngurra showcased his first depiction of Baldwin Spencer to the world, depicting him standing face to face with an Aboriginal man, surrounded by objects that correspond to both of the men's cultures. In Baldwin Spencer and Paddy Cahill (2003), Maralngurra painted Spencer using rarrk, ceremonial cross-hatching. When asked about its meaning, he refused to explain, stating that it referenced secret Mardayin knowledge. This shows how he layered restricted cultural meaning into depictions of colonial subjects. By doing this, art historian Henry Skerritt argues, Maralngurra drew attention to "the limits of communication and boundaries of exchange of visitors to his region."

In one of his earliest depictions of Baldwin Spencer, Maralngurra separates himself from traditional Kunwinjku art by portraying Spencer in an x-ray style, an approach that was used solely for animals and almost never applied to humans. This choice changes Spencer from a colonial anthropologist to an object to analyze and observe in the eyes of the Indigenous people. When asked about this decision, Maralngurra explains “He can see right through him that clever man,” alluding to the spiritual power of an Aboriginal sorcerer. Rather than literal representation, this choice indicates the ability of Indigenous knowledge to go through colonial standards, turning the lens back on those who once studied them.

Maralngurra’s contact paintings are known not only for their historical aspects but also for the way they show an appearing Indigenous art historical consciousness. These works go further than the mere cross-cultural meetings with outside figures, but examine and analyze the role that outside people, such as collectors and anthropologists, play in the market and outside perception of Aboriginal art. By going back to the arrival of people like Baldwin Spencer and Charles Mountford, Maralngurra uses these figures as pivotal pieces in the transformation of Kunwinjku art, where traditional art was adapted to fit the new mold of viewing and collecting. His paintings serve as visual explanations as to how Indigenous artists historically adapted to the growing external audience.

Gabriel Maralngurra’s contact paintings purposefully blur the walls between Western historical documentation and Indigenous storytelling. Even though Maralngurra claimed he referenced books for the history of Oenpelli, the historical inaccuracies in his depictions. Examples of this include the appearance of Spencer’s wife in scenes she never should have been in, or the incorporation of a car not yet present in the region, suggesting that factual precision was never his goal. Henry Skerritt, an art historian, believes that these artistic decisions show signs of a deeper meaning: to assert his contact paintings and indigenous narrative authority as an equal with Western historical record. His work challenges the positivist stance of Western historiography by presenting contact imagery as an artwork where Indigenous ideas and Western concepts mingle and coincide.

In these paintings, Maralngurra combines traditional and contemporary techniques to show the combinatory nature of history and cultural exchange. By using many different styles within a single artwork, he highlights the many different intricacies and complexities of the Indigenous response to colonial involvement. His pieces do not treat the frontier as a complete division between coloniser and Indigenous people, but a space where people can mingle and create new identities within themselves. This artistic approach reflects a broader Indigenous worldview, which showcases history not as a line, but a web of convoluted relationships.

Despite the success he had in gaining notoriety for these works, Maralngurra moved on from his "contact paintings" after 2007, which Henry Skerritt assumed to mean that this project was a "diversion from his primary artistic project." Maralngurra expressed he was “done with contact paintings,” viewing them as a diversion from his core practice focused on Dreaming narratives and ecological motifs. His work challenged the Western notion of linear time, blending Dreaming narratives with colonial encounters to reflect a Kunwinjku understanding of consciousness.

Maralngurra's art pieces are showcased in diverse collections both within the country and abroad, such as those at the Australian Museum, Museums Victoria, South Australian Museum, and the Kluge-Ruhe Aboriginal Art Collection in the United States. Some of his most notable contact paintings include Meeting of Bininj Elders and Balanda Visitors in 1948 (1948), Baldwin Spencer and Paddy Cahill (2003), and Bininj at the rock Art Shelter (2006). Many of these paintings were displayed at his solo exhibition Contact at the Mossenson Galleries in Melbourne in 2006. Many of Gabriel's pieces during this time indicated his opposition of the colonization, and he wanted the Balanda to know that their culture was deep rooted and old.

=== Charlottesville exhibition ===
In January 2020, Gabriel Manalngurra undertook residency at the University of Virginia in Charlottesville, Virginia. During this time, Maralngurra and Joe Guymala visited Charlottesville to talk about and display their works in various locations across the city. This citywide exhibition consisted of more than 50 artists, five different locations, and about 200 pieces. One of the main centres for Aboriginal art in the world lies in the centre of Charlottesville: the Kluge-Rhue Aboriginal Art Collection. It includes more than 2000 pieces of Indigenous art, and each year invites Aboriginal artists from various regions to visit, lead workshops, and provide classes to locals and UVA students. This was just one of the many locations the citywide exhibition took place.

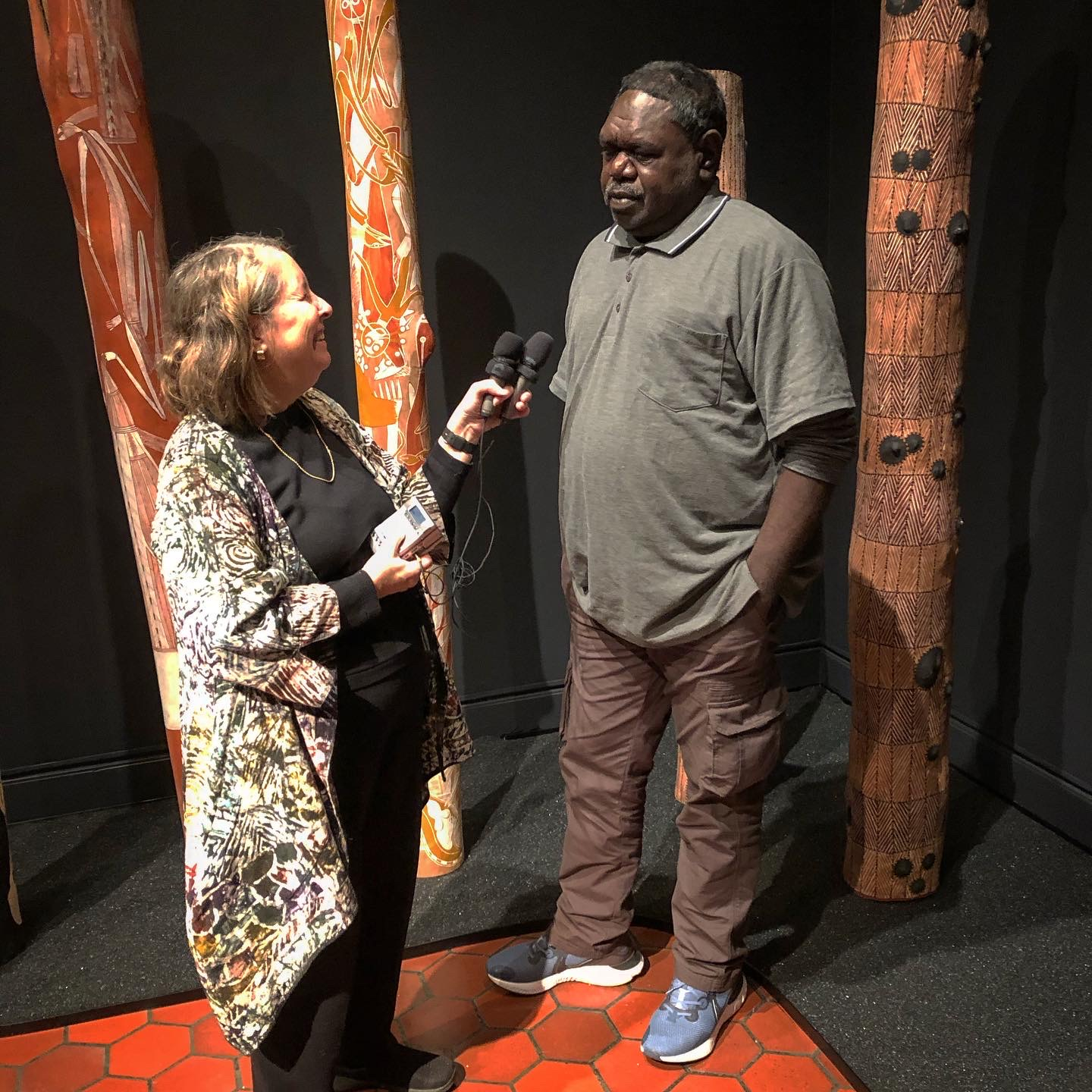
Gabriel Maralngurra being interviewed by Sandy Hausman for WVTF Radio IQ for the exhibition "The Inside World: Contemporary Aboriginal Australian Memorial Poles" at The Fralin Museum of Art at the University of Virginia.

Maralngurra played a large role in the exhibition located in the Fralin Museum located on the Grounds of the University of Virginia. Specifically, the exhibition located in the Fralin Museum, The Inside World: Contemporary Aboriginal Australian Memorial Poles consisted of 112 memorial poles by 55 different artists from various regions of Arnhem Land, curated by Henry Skerritt. Maralngurra collaborated with Skerritt, contributing to the exhibit by painting one of the displayed poles and creating a painting showcased in Jefferson's Rotunda. The Aboriginal Memorial comprised hollow coffins decorated with clan designs, and signified the moment when the spirit of the deceased had finally returned home. Maralngurra participated in a group of six memorial poles from his region that were done using Earth pigments on wood and included images such as the mimih spirit. The art is not only in the painting on the wooden logs, but also the difficult process of harvesting the logs. According to Maralngurra, the purpose of bringing this work to Charlottesville is to share and promote their strong culture from the other side of the world.

Maralngurra displayed another piece of rock art style called "Kunwardde Bim Kakukyime" that hung on the walls of the Rotunda on the university grounds . This piece is the perfect example of how Maralngurra incorporates local figures such as the brolga bird and the mimih spirit to further connect his artwork to his country and its inhabitants. Kunwardde Bim Kakukyime (Rock Art Style) illustrates a wide range of overlapping animals specific to his region in various shades of red, white, yellow, and even some blue. The brolga positioned slightly left of the centre of the image is known to be a hunting prize for the people in his community. He executes this depiction of the bird in x-ray style, meaning he includes the imagery of the internal organs and bone structure of the animal. The incorporation of the anatomical features of the bird proves how well connected he is with the inhabitants of his land. in the bottom left corner, he includes a Mimih Spirit which is said to have taught his people many of the skills they would have needed to survive such as hunting. The Mimih spirits watched over the people and were first depicted on rock, then on bark paintings, and finally on fabrics and paper. The Kunwinjku people state that the Mimih are the first to have inhabited Arnhem land. This organised chaos shows how he uses a variety of figures and colours to represent the identity of his community in a unique way.

=== Resolving unauthorised use of artwork ===
In 2008, Gabriel Maralngurra worked with the legal group called “Artists in the Black” to fix a situation where his artwork had been used without credit or his knowledge for over 20 years. A non-profit centre in Oenpelli had used one of his early drawings as their logo. They were putting it on trucks, planes, signs, and papers, without asking for Gabriel Maralngurra’s permission or giving him credit. Gabriel felt proud to see his art used in this way, but he was also upset that he was never recognized as the artist or even paid. He, with legal help, sent a letter asking for acknowledgement and fair payment to Oenpelli. Oenpelli agreed, and they promised to name him as the artist of the logo in all future uses. They also gave him a generous payment. This case highlights issues related to copyright, moral rights, and Indigenous cultural and intellectual property.

== Author, mentor, researcher and educator ==
Maralngurra was deeply interested in the colonial history of western Arnhem Land and collaborated on numerous research projects with anthropologists, archaeologists, historians, and more. He mentored them with great patience, humour, and profound cultural knowledge. Among his most enduring works are The Kunwinjku Counting Book and Aboriginal History and the Telling of History, a book he co-authored with Laura Rademaker, Sally K. May, and Joakim Goldhahn, published in 2024 by Cambridge University Press.

== Other roles ==
Maralngurra was also a tour guide, translator, Injalak Hill Board member and president. His strong presence in Australia led him to travel often throughout the region and abroad for the past twenty-five years.

== Death ==
Maralngurra died on 26 February 2025.

== Awards ==
- 2006: Best Indigenous Artist during the 2006 Melbourne Fringe Festival
- 2010: Telstra Indigenous Art Awards - Highly Commended for "Wurdwurd (children) Kudjekbinj Dreaming"

== Collections ==
- National Museum of Australia
- Department of Foreign Affairs, Canberra
- Museum and Art Gallery of the Northern Territory
- Museum Victoria
- Batchelor Institute, N.T.
- Berndt Museum of Anthropology, University of Western Australia
- Kluge-Ruhe Aboriginal Art Collection of the University of Virginia

== Significant exhibitions ==
- 2020 Munguyhmunguyh (Forever): Celebrating the 30th Anniversary of the John W. Kluge Injalak Commission, The Upper West Oval Room of The Rotunda at the University of Virginia
- 2019-2020 The Inside World: Contemporary Aboriginal Australian Memorial Poles. Nevada Museum of Art, Reno, NV; Charles H. Wright Museum of African American History, Detroit, MI; The Fralin Museum of Art, University of Virginia, Charlottesville, VA; Frost Art Museum, Florida International University, Miami, FL.
- 2018 'Manme Manmak' Good Food! Central Craft's June Marriott Gallery August 27 - September 16, 2018.
- 2017 Salon Des Refuses, Charles Darwin University, Darwin
- 2017 Get it On 2017, Aboriginal Bush Traders, Darwin
- 2017 Mayhmayh -Different Birds, Works on paper, bark and hollow logs, Nomad Art Gallery, Darwin
- 2016 Interiors-Fabric panels, Framed the Darwin Gallery
- 2016 Salon Des Refuses, Charles Darwin University, Darwin
- 2016 Kunwinkju Counting Book Exhibition and Launch, Nomad Art Gallery, Darwin
- 2016 12th Festival of Pacific Art - Group Exhibition, Guam Museum, Guam
- 2015 Wearables, Tactile Arts Gallery, Darwin
- 2015 Salon Des Refuses, Darwin Waterfront, Darwin
- 2015 Dolobbo: Contemporary Bark Paintings from Injalak Arts, Aboriginal & Pacific Art, Sydney
- 2013 Wurrkabal, Netanya Resort, Noosa, QLD
- 2013 Injalak Arts Exhibition, Better World Arts, Port Adelaide
- 2009 Ochre and Rust, Indigenart Gallery, Perth
- 2008 Sex, Spirits & Sorcery, Mossenson Galleries, Melbourne
- 2007 Continuity, Country and Culture: Three Generations
- 2007 The Injalak Hill Suite, Aboriginal & Pacific Art Gallery, Danks St, Sydney
- 2006 Paper, Bark, Canvas & Twine, Dickerson Gallery, Melbourne
- 2006: Making Contact. Solo Exhibition. Mossenson Galleries, Melbourne, September 26–October 22, 2006.
- 2006 Wet and Dry, Indigenart Gallery, Perth WA
- 2006 24th National Aboriginal & Torres Strait Islander Art Award, MAGNT, Darwin NT
- 2006 The Second Peter Baillie Acquisitive Award, Flinders University, Adelaide SA
- 2005 Concord, Framed Gallery, Darwin
- 2004 21st Telstra National Aboriginal & Torres Strait Islander Art Award
- 2003 Art Mob Exhibition Tasmania
- 2003 20th Telstra National Aboriginal & Torres Strait Islander Art Award
- 2001 Telstra National Aboriginal and Torres Strait Islander Art Award
- 1998 Desert Designs Japingka Gallery, Perth WA
- 1996 Framed Gallery, Darwin NT
- 1995 21st Telstra National Aboriginal & Torres Strait Islander Art Award
- 1995 The Twelfth National Aboriginal Art Award Exhibition, Museums and Art Galleries of the Northern Territory Darwin
- 1994 Aboriginal & Tribal Art Gallery The Rocks, Sydney, NSW
- 1993 Editions, Southbank, Melbourne, VIC
- 1993 Hogarth Aboriginal and Tribal Art Gallery
- 1993 Stories, Contemporary Australian Aboriginal Art Kerava Art
- 1993 Helsinki and Rovaniemi Art Museum Lapland, Finland
- 1993 Burukmarri Gallery, Fremantle WA
