= Wanurr Bob Namundja =

Australian Aboriginal artist

- Born: c.1933 Jim Jim Creek, Northern Territory, Australia
- Died: 2005; Gunbalanya, Northern Territory, Australia
- Known for: Aboriginal art, bark painting
- Spouse: Dianne Ginjmulu
- Children: Samson Namundja (son), Kaye Namundja (daughter)
- Relatives: Don Nakadilinj Namundja (brother)

Wanurr Bob Namundja (c.1933–2005) was an Aboriginal Australian artist known for his bark paintings.

== Biography ==
Wanurr Bob Namundja was born in western Arnhem Land to the Kardbam clan in 1933. He spoke Kunwinjku which is part of the Bininj Kunwok language group.

During the 1960s, he lived on the Oenpelli Mission in what is now known as Gunbalanya in the Northern Territory of Australia. With the rise of the outstation movement, he split time in the 1970s between Gunbalanya and the small community of Makorlod. By the mid-1980s, he had returned to Gunbalayana with his wife Dianne and his four children to work as a police tracker. He was the older brother of Don Nakadilinj Namundja, who also became an artist.

Wanurr spent many years traveling throughout Australia, participating in cultural ceremonies and maintaining his relationships with his extended family. Specifically, he had known social affiliations with the Yirritja moiety and Nawakadj subsection.

Outside of being an artist and a family man, he also worked in law enforcement and as a stock-man in Central Arnhem Land.

== Career ==
During the 1960s, Wanurr was part of a group of artists who began painting professionally through the Church Mission Society’s Oenpelli Mission, under the encouragement of linguist Peter Carroll. After the closing of the Oenpelli Mission, Wanurr painted for Dorothy Bennett, until the founding of the Injalak Arts Centre in 1989.

Along with Bardayal Nadjamerrek, Wanurr was one of the senior managers of the Kunabibi ceremony which the anthropologist Luke Taylor argues had a major impact on the range of imagery produced in western Arnhem Land, particularly in depictions of Ngalyod (the Rainbow Serpent). Ngalyod is associated with the fertility and seasonal changes of spring, especially with the monsoons during the wet season. Because of this, she is often represented using transformations into plants and animals, such as waterlilies and fish. There are also pieces that include features of several animals morphed into one being. Wanurr was one of the earlier artists to draw this figure in a more contemporary sense as it represents the unification of various groups and resonates the idea that humans are all one people. Hence, Wanurr opted to take a more abstract approach in order to capture this shift in social awareness among Kunwinjku artists.

Wanurr is usually associated with a small group of men from the southern clans of western Arnhem Land whose style was heavily influenced by Bardayal "Lofty" Nadjamerrek. These men, which included Dick Nguleingulei Murrumurru, Kalarriya "Jimmy" Namarnyilk and Don Nakadilinj Namundja. Painting alongside each other, these men drew heavily on their rock art heritage, remaining steadfastly figurative in their motifs, and restricting themselves to single, parallel-line infill (or rarrk) to embellish their figures. This was in contrast to many other artists who chose to use more elaborate cross-hatching like that used in ceremonial designs.

Bob Namundja painted what he saw around him as well as culturally relevant inspirations. He learned the tradition of rock art from his father. His works ranged from painting plants and animals found in Arnhem Land to ancient spirits and ancestors. His mediums of choice are natural pigments and eucalyptus bark. He favored earthy red and yellow colours that were more traditional to Aboriginal art in his works, stemming from their use of natural pigments. He favors using a single, parallel line infill technique, often grouped in bands of the earthy red and yellow pigments. Also, due to his Yirritja connection, his art features diamond shapes.

== Collections ==
- National Museum of Australia
- Museum of Contemporary Art Australia

== Significant exhibitions ==
- 1984-5: Kunwinjku Bim: Western Arnhem Land paintings from the Collection of the Aboriginal Arts Board. National Gallery of Victoria. 7 December 1984 – 24 June 1985.
- 1995: Meat Market Craft Centre, Melbourne Victoria, September 1995.
- 1998: Japingka Gallery Desert Designs, Perth WA, March 1998.
- 1998: Dreamings. Spazio Pitti Arte, Florence Italy, April 1998.
- 1998: Volkenkundig Museum, Rotterdam Netherlands, May 1998.
- 1998: The Hague Unites the Nations. The Hague Netherlands, May 1998.
- 1998: From Bush to City. Hogarth Galleries, Sydney NSW, October 1998.
- 2004: Salon "ART PARIS". Carrousel du Louvre, Paris.
- 2004: Crossing Country: The Alchemy of Western Arnhem Land Art. Art Gallery of New South Wales, Sydney, 25 September - 12 December 2004.
- 2005: Old Men's Stories: Senior Artists from Oenpelli. Indigenart, The Mossenson Galleries, 29 January–20 February 2005.
- 2005: Terre de Rêves, Terre des Hommes. Musée de la Préhistoire d’Île de France, Nemours.
- 2005: The Art of Two Brothers. National Gallery of Victoria, Melbourne Victoria, 24 November–17 December 2005.
- 2006: L’art aborigène contemporain. Médiathèque Cathédrale de Reims, Reims.
