= Joe Guymala =

Aboriginal Australian artist and musician

- Born: 1969 (age 56–57); Manmoyi, Northern Territory, Australia
- Organization: Injalak Arts
- Known for: Bark painting, lorrkon,
- Relatives: Namerredje Guymala (grandfather)

Joe Guymala (born 1969) is an Aboriginal Australian artist and musician of the Burdoh clan of the Kunwinjku people, known for his paintings on bark, paper and memorial poles known as lorrkkon.

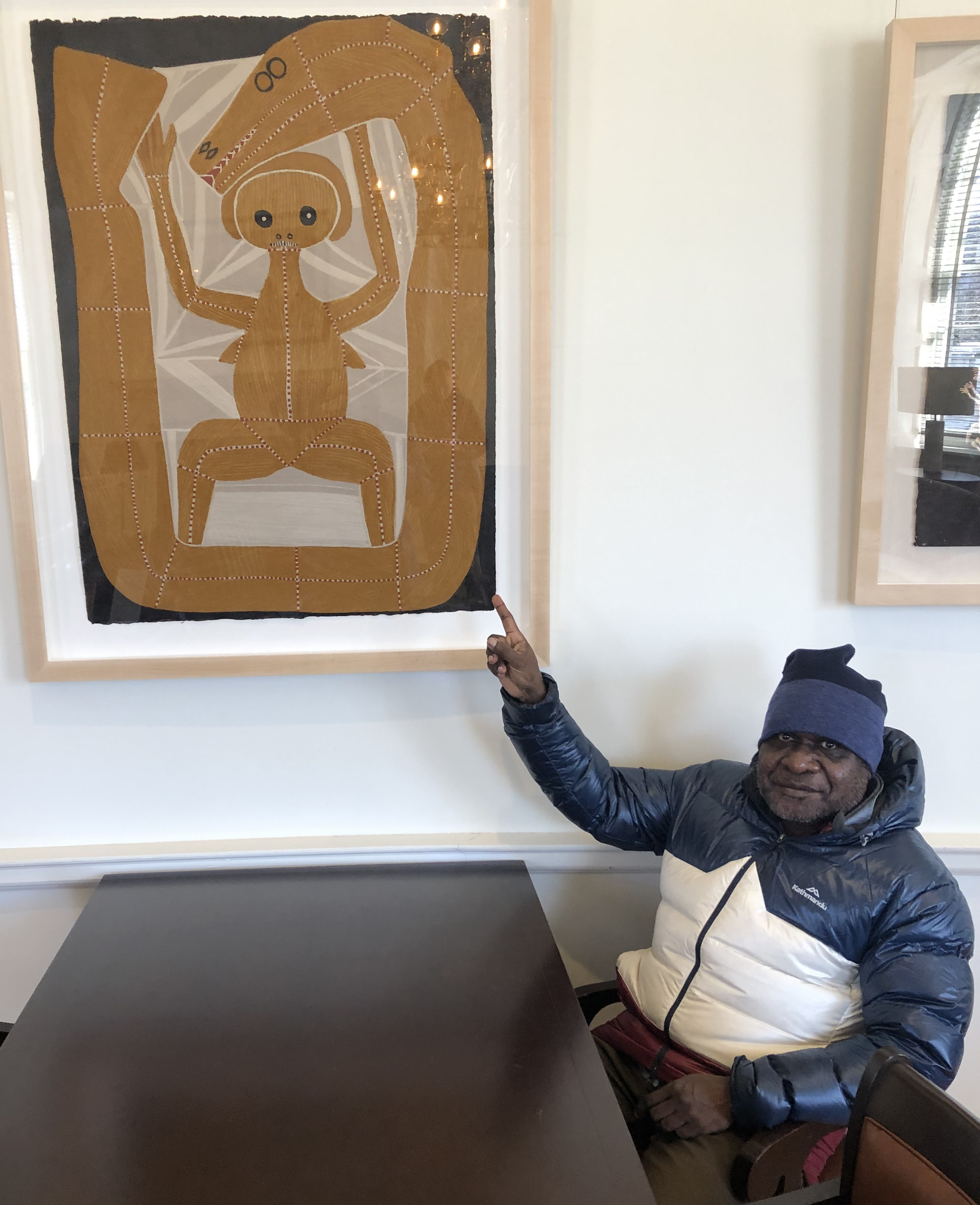
Joe Guymala points to his work "Ngalyod dja Ngalkunburriyaymi (Rainbow Serpent and Water Spirit)" 2018 on display as part of the exhibition "Munguyhmunguyh" at the University of Virginia, January 2020.

== Early life, music, and other activities ==
Joe Guymala was born in 1969 at Manmoyi outstation, about 160 kilometres (100 mi) east of Gunbalanya, Northern Territory.

Guymala is a skilled musician and toured across Australia with both the Mimih and Nabarlek bands before turning to painting. Guymala wrote many songs about traditional stories and country in his time as a musician. Guymala also worked as a member of the Warddeken Rangers where he controlled feral animals, protected rock art sites, and managed controlled burns of country.

== Career ==
Guymala began painting in 2010, influenced by his grandfather Namerredje Guymala who painted on barks and rock shelters. Guymala's early works are characteristic of traditional Kunwinjku style and feature a mixture of rarrk (cross-hatching) and rock-art style to portray kangaroos, fish, crows, and mimihs. It did not take long for Guymala to begin experimenting with different forms creating his own interpretation of single line rarrk using unrefined ochres. Guymala has mastered the art of painting with manyilk, a thin sedge brush to apply line after line, layer upon layer to his compositions. Guymala's work is often considered playful and features his day-to-day life out bush. He paints primarily for Injalak Arts in Gunbalanya.

== Residency at the University of Virginia ==
In January 2020, Guymala traveled to Charlottesville, Virginia for the opening of the exhibitions The Inside World at The Fralin Museum of Art and Munguyhmunguyh (Forever) which was organized by the Kluge-Ruhe Aboriginal Art Collection. Guymala was able to view works in the Kluge-Ruhe collection produced by his grandfather. During his time at the University of Virginia, Guymala created his first limited-edition print, working with master-print Akemi Ohira in the McIntire Department of Art to produce a linoprint on mulberry paper. He also performed his songs on radio station WTJU and in performances at The Fralin Museum of Art.

== Collections ==
- Kluge-Ruhe Aboriginal Art Collection of the University of Virginia
- Museum and Art Gallery of the Northern Territory

== Significant exhibitions ==
- 2016: Rising Stars. Outstation Gallery, Darwin, NT.
- 2017: Salon des Refusés. Charles Darwin University Art Gallery, Charles Darwin University, Darwin, NT.
- 2018: Joe Guymala is in the Building. Provenance Arts. Darwin, NT.
- 2018: The 35th Telstra National Aboriginal and Torres Strait Islander Art Awards. Museum and Art Gallery of the Northern Territory, Darwin, NT.
- 2019-2020: The Inside World: Contemporary Aboriginal Australian Memorial Poles. Nevada Museum of Art, Reno, NV; Charles H. Wright Museum of African American History, Detroit, MI; The Fralin Museum of Art, University of Virginia, Charlottesville, VA; Frost Art Museum, Florida International University, Miami, FL.
- 2020: Munguyhmunguyh (Forever): Celebrating the 30th Anniversary of the John W. Kluge Injalak Commission. The Upper West Oval Room of The Rotunda at the University of Virginia
- Mankerrnge Bim (New Paintings), 9–30 October 2021, Rebecca Hossack Gallery, London, UK.
