= Thompson Yulidjirri =

- Born: c.1930 Croker Island
- Died: 1 October 2009; Gunbalanya
- Other name: Yulitjirri
- Known for: Indigenous Australian art

Thompson Yulidjirri (1930–2009) was an Aboriginal Australian artist of the Kunwinjku people of western Arnhem Land in the Northern Territory of Australia. Yulidjirri was renowned for his wide knowledge of ancestral creation narratives and ceremony, his painting skills and mentorship of young artists at the Injalak Arts and Crafts centre.

== Biography ==
Thompson Yulidjirri was born in 1930 and raised on Croker Island by the artist Paddy Compass Namadbara, who adopted Yulidjirri after his parents' death at a young age. After an attack by Japanese planes during World War II, Yulidjirri and Namatbara moved to the coast of the Arafura Sea for safety, where he grew up in north east Arnhem Land. Yulidjirri worked at a saw mill in Murgenella as a teen and on the barge that dropped supplies to communities along the coast from Darwin.

In early 1990s, Yulidjirri came to Injalak Arts to paint, and eventually began teaching and mentoring the young men around him. While he would paint, he would tell select young men around him the stories he was painting and teach them his techniques. This was significant because the young men that Yulidjirri imparted his knowledge to had no close blood relation to him or his country and these men later went on to be the primary art producers at the centre today. Yulidjirri would finish a piece, bring it to Injalak, and many of his fellow artists would gather around to hear him discuss its meaning. Many visitors come to tour Injalak Hill, an ancient rock art site nearby, and Yulidjirri served as one of the original guides. He passed on much of his knowledge and understanding of the imagery on the rock walls to the newer generation of guides so that the stories could be preserved and remembered.

== Career ==
As a senior Kunbarlanja community member, Thompson Yulidjirri understood the undeniable link between rock painting and Kunbarlanja's most famously traded art form, bark painting. He described the purpose of these paintings as "decoration and education," using painting to illustrate stories and teach children about local culture.

In the early 1990s, Thompson Yulidjirri come to the Injalak Arts and began teaching young men as he worked. Yulidjirri even mentored the founder of Injalak Arts, Gabriel Maralngurra, underscoring just how large of an impact he had on the center, especially those of Maralngurra's generation. Thompson is also credited with educating young Kunbarlanja artists on the complex regulations and cultural protocols relating to Aboriginal art and clan imagery. These protocols were taught to Yulidjirri by Paddy Namatbara Compass, the famous artist and rock painter who raised him.

One article describes a painting style used among this generation as "Yulidjirri mode." This style features figures with long, articulated limbs and beak-like mouths and cross-hatching known as rarrk. The use of rarrk is connected to the Madayin ceremony, meaning that when it is featured in works, there is a hidden meaning in its depiction about the artist's clan. Using rarrk in his works allowed Yulidjirri to combine tradition and ancestral power with the contemporary.

As younger generations began to experiment and innovate, tensions arose. Young artists preferred to paint similarly to older painters, rather than the approved images of non-sacred images which they were allowed to paint. This led to anger from older artists, however, Yulidjirri worked as a mediator between innovation and tradition to alleviate tensions and guide the new generation of artists. These men that Yulidjirri mentored and taught continue his tradition as they pass knowledge and skills down to the younger generations. The artist Gary Djorlam notes, "Old Thompson Yulidjirri I is the one who taught us how to paint. Then he passed it on to his children, even myself and the boys who works here at Injalak. He was the best artist and a story teller, I'm proud off him, his painting and teaching and telling stories all sorts of dreaming stories, animals and birds, trees, mountains, animals like crocodiles, kangaroo or even the rainbow serpent."

In 1988, Yulidjirri traveled to Los Angeles for the opening of the exhibition Dreams and Life at Caz Gallery in West Hollywood. Along with fellow artist Bobby Barrdjaray Nganjmirra, Yulidjirri painted a two-sided piece of slate measuring over 7 feet tall and more than 5 feet wide. The work was purchased by American businessman John W. Kluge, an Aboriginal arts collector and the founder of Metromedia, before being donated to the University of Virginia in 1997. In 1997, Yulidjirri was invited to create an imitation rock shelter at the Australian Museum in Sydney. For many years, the work was the centerpiece of the museum's Indigenous Australian display.

From 1991 to 1992, Yulidjirri painted five works on paper for the John W. Kluge Injalak Commission, including Ngurlmarrk–The Ubarr Ceremony. His work was so well-liked because he had no preferred medium, nor did he place heavy significance on medium. Instead, the importance of his art was drawn from the sense of community he built from his production of art. His work focused on stories told to him, which he passed on to others, and from there his community spread. He was able to bring tradition to the present and make it interactive and engaging with others.

In 1995, Yulidjirri was the subject of a feature article by Paul Raffaele in the July edition of Reader's Digest.

In 1996, Yulidjirri collaborated with the Marrugeku Company, Australia’s leading indigenous intercultural dance company, on Mimi, a performance commissioned and produced by the Perth Festival. As the spiritual, artistic, and historical advisor for the project, Yulidjirri extended his mentorship far beyond Injalak Arts. Accompanied by Yulidjirri’s narration, "Mimi" incorporated music, dance, stilt-work and visual effects to explore a metaphorical journey where spirits and humans meets at significant points through time.

In 2001, Yulidjirri also collaborated with the Marrugeku Company on an intercultural performance called Crying Baby. A combination of stilt dancing, music, and visual effects, the performance tells the story of Australia's colonization, weaving contemporary, historical, and djang (dreaming) stories from Western Arnhem land. Instead of writing a script for Crying Baby, Yulidjirri narrated the performance with his own stories, relating his journey through life as an orphan to the Stolen Generations, Djang (dreaming), and the history of Reverend John Watson. The production, which incorporated indigenous dancers from Western Australia and Kunwinjku dancers and musicians from Arnhem Land, travelled to Holland, Belgium and Ireland after its successful premiere at the Perth International Arts Festival in 2001

Yulidjirri has found much success in painting; his works can be found in some of the most prestigious collections, he has been a NATSIAA finalist on multiple occasions, and his art hangs in Darwin Airport.

== Works ==
One major work of art by Thompson Yulidjirri is called Ngurlmarrk--The Ubarr Ceremony from 1991, which was purchased by John Kluge. The story of the creation of the Ubarr ceremony begins with an ancient hunter and magician known as Yirrbardbard, who planned to murder his wife and mother in law. In a cave in Gunbalanya, Yirrbardbard drew on the walls a picture of his wife and mother-in-law, with a snake mid-strike at their feet. He then turned into a snake himself to murder them; afterwards, he decides to create a ceremony to tribute his deed and names Nadlumi the kangaroo to be the keeper of the ceremony (Ubarr). In this work, Yulidjirri depicts the ancient snake and kangaroo, as well as contemporary implementations of the ceremony; this work combines the past and present, spiritual and secular, and he uses rarrk to unify it all.

Another work by Thompson Yulidjirri is Black Crow and the Fish Trap. Yulidjirri painted this based on a story taught to him by another painter, Midjawmidjaw. In the story, the Black Crow made a fish trap. When the Black Crow went to sleep, some people came and took the trap so that they could catch fish in the river. When the Black Crow woke up and discovered this, he was furious. In a rage, he cut down a paperbark tree, which divided the island of Goulburn in two when it fell. Now, there exists a North Goulburn and South Goulburn. Anywhere on the island, one will not see a black crow catching or eating fish; only the other birds. In the painting, there a large fishing net, which Yulidjirri used rarrk to depict the weaving of the net. Next to the fishing net is a human, who eventually steals the net in the story, with the Black Crow above him (Photo unavailable due to copyright restrictions, but can be viewed in the following footnote).

Aside from rock art and paper, Yulidjirri has also made prints. There is one plate in particular which Yulidjirri based on rock art near Gunbalanya. In the lithograph, he depicts Yingana, an ancestral figure. Yingana is an important part of the Kunwinjku culture, as she created the Aboriginal people. In her tale, Yingana came from the Arfura sea with dillybags full of yams. As she traveled around the land, she planted yams and scattered spirit children around, giving them all different languages and cultures; these would be the original members of current clans.

Fibre production was also an integral part of life for Thompson Yulidjirri and the Kuwinjku people, as it has been embedded in all aspects of Kunwinjku culture for thousands of years. In Kunwinjku culture, fibre has both ceremonial and practical roles, and is central to the belief systems of the region. Alongside their ceremonial associations, baskets, dilly bags, and other fibre forms are linked with the ancestral stories that pervade Kunwinjku life. According to Yulidjirri, the "Yingarna" figure, or the "Rainbow Serpent" is the ancestor whose journey resulted in the creation of Indigenous people in Arnhem Land by dispersing them in fibre dilly bags near Injalak Hill.

== Collections ==
- Australian Museum, Sydney
- Kluge-Ruhe Aboriginal Art Collection of the University of Virginia
- National Gallery of Australia
- National Gallery of Victoria
- National Museum of Australia
