= Bardayal 'Lofty' Nadjamerrek =

Australian Aboriginal painter (c. 1926–2009)

Bardayal "Lofty" Nadjamerrek AO
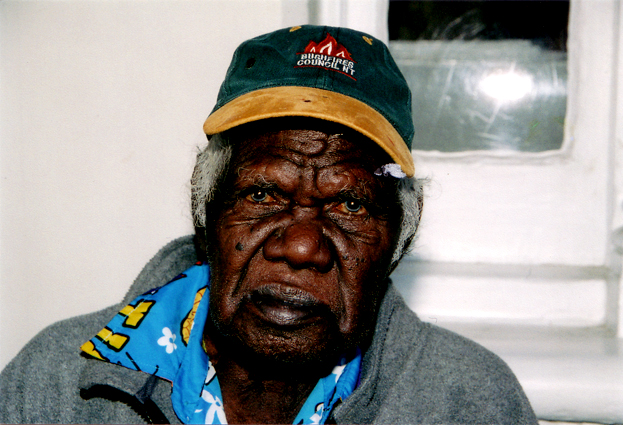
- Born: c. 1926; Arnhemland, Northern Territory
- Died: 2009; Arnhemland, Northern Territory
- Known for: Painting
- Spouse: Mary Kolkiwarra Nadjamerrek
- Awards: Officer in the General Division of the Order of Australia

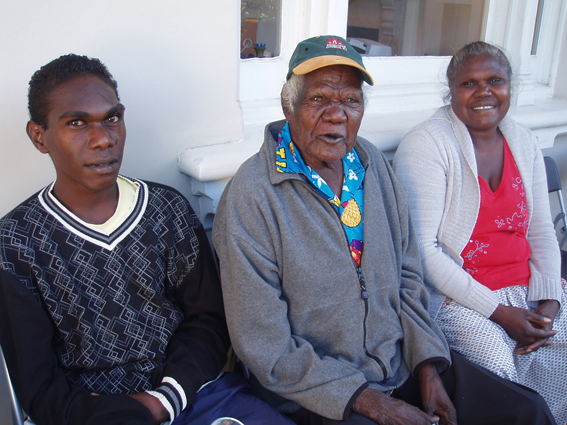
Maath Maralngurra, Bardayal Nadjamerrek and Donna Nadjamerrek at Mossenson Galleries, Melbourne, 2006.

Bardayal "Lofty" Nadjamerrek AO (c. 1926–2009) was a Kunwinjku Aboriginal artist of the Mok clan. He belonged to the Duwa moiety and spoke the Kundedjnjenghmi language. He is currently referred to by his skin and clan as "Wamud Namok", following the Kunwinjku custom of avoiding use of the name of deceased persons.

Bardayal Nadjamerrek was made an Officer of the Order of Australia (AO) in the 2004 Australia Day Honours for "service to the preservation of Indigenous culture as a Senior Traditional man and significant artist whose work documents the relationship of the land and its ancestral past via the Mimih Spirits of rock art". He is recognized as being very knowledgeable about country, environment, and the use of ochres. He helped map out places of "Aboriginal cultural significance, sacred sites that may have been lost had they not been documented."

== Early life ==
Bardayal “Lofty” Nadjamerrek, who was otherwise known as Wamud Namok, was born around 1926 in the upper Mann River region of Western Arnhem Land to his father, Yanjorluk. When Bardayal was young, he and his family spent time traveling the plateau, “developing his detailed knowledge of the stone country.” Nadjamerrek spent much of his childhood on the plateau known as Stone Country where he lived a largely traditional hunter-gatherer life with occasional visits to missions and settlements to trade goods.

== Early career ==
Nadjamerrek was first introduced to art, specifically rock art, by his father, Yanjorluk, in the early 1940s. His early rock art style learning was influenced by the traditional rock art style of Western Arnhem Land. This area of Australia contains some of the oldest evidence and remnants of rock art.

Before formally venturing into art, he had worked on a variety of different physical jobs, such as mining tin, chopping wood, gardening, and working as a stockman. With the influence of his father's teachings, Nadjamerrek translated his knowledge into the practice of bark paintings, beginning his work in the public domain in 1969. He spent years of his apprenticeship observing the craft of his father and other men in his community paint on the rocky shelters and outcrops with natural ochres and pigments. Within the Oenpelli Mission Church, linguist Peter Carroll offered Nadjamerrek and the other men to stop chopping wood for the choice of painting. With some experience from his father's teachings, he chose to paint at the age of forty-four.

During World War 2, Bardayal's apprenticeship in art was put on hold as he was indentured to timber cutting service for the war effort. Years later he continued to work in the non-artistic sphere, taking jobs as “a miner, stockman, buffalo shooter and market gardener.” Even though his art career was put on hold, Bardayal remained increasingly active in the ceremonial activities of his clan, further strengthening his ties to traditional culture which will later be seen in his paintings.

Bardayal ‘Lofty’ Nadjamerrek's work included bark paintings, etchings, paper and print media works, as well as other reprographic techniques. His work investigates the connection between humans and nature, as well as ancient traditions while reflecting his Country and heritage and often illustrating stories which carry deep cultural significance. Through his art, Nadjamerrek strived to encourage people to develop a deeper understanding of and cultivate respect for Aboriginal cultures.

== Bardayal Nadjamerrek and Community ==
In his later life, Bardayal came to be one of the most respected elders not only in his clan, but also in the Western Arnhem Land region. In the 1970s, he was a main contributor in helping Indigenous families return to their traditional lands and establishing six outstations.

After almost two decades, he was finally able to return to his own clan estate. Unfortunately, during his time away the Australian government halted stage funding for outstations. With his prior experience with other clans, Nadjamerrek created the Kabulwarnamyo outstation by himself in the mid 1990s. Kabulwarnamyo is a part of the Ankung Djang estate which belonged to the Mok clan. This outstation attracted various kinds of people from other parts of Australia and the world, including anthropologists, linguists, botanists, ecologists, and art historians, who came to learn more about the vast landscape of Arnhem Land. Nadjamerrek served as an encyclopedia for all knowledge pertaining to his culture and Arnhem Land, promoting Indigenous land management, culture, and heritage to all new people traveling to the landscape. Out of this outstation also came community programs and research projects which promoted these three aspects as well.

== Rock Art ==
Nadjamerrek created his first rock art painting around the age of 13, at a place called Kundjorlomdjorlom, under the close observance of his father, Nanjorluk, an accomplished rock-art artist. His father Yanjorluk taught him to paint in the upper Mann River region of western Arnhem Land in the 1940s. The rock art of the region contains some of the oldest evidence of replicated image-making known in the history of art.

Even in modern times, these rock art sites remain incredibly important, and they are so numerous. Arnhem Land is covered in sandstone escarpments, which create wet season shelters that provide security in the wet times and kept them cool in the hot summers. Shelters can include hundreds of painted images. Many believe that the palimpsest of artistic styles found on these escarpments date back to being done by the mimih (rock spirits). Older generations visit these shelters and see these as places as a spiritual experience. In a more rare case, there are restricted rock art sites that are only allowed to be visited by senior men, as they have deep connections to secret ceremony. It is not an archaeological investigation like it is to the Balanda; these are the "places where they grew up as children and where their memories of dabbarrabbolk ('the old people') are centred. The paintings in the shelters are sometimes quite recent." Artistic heritage is woven into these paintings, so traveling to visit them was almost like a pilgrimage to understand where they came from. However, there are many of these escarpments that are also very secular in use, using those rock paintings as decoration.

However, most rock art was made for educational purposes. There is a wonderful story of Nadjamerrek using his rock-art inspired drawings to teach his son how to butcher an emu. "His son Makkumakku had returned from a hunting excursion with an emu, and he followed his father's instructions on how to prepare it for the ground oven and then butcher it after cooking. This lesson was explained with a series of drawings while the emu cooked. At first Bardayal illustrated, in simple line drawings, some of the salient parts of the butchered emu. He then drew the complete animal, citing all the names of the different body parts specific to emus. The emu was then pulled out of the ground oven and eaten, while reflecting on the illustrated lesson in emu-preparation etiquette"

=== Contact Rock Art ===
Contact rock art refers to Indigenous artworks that depict subject matter introduced during periods of cross-cultural contact, especially within colonial contexts. For a while, contact art was especially seen as being untraditional, as it did not depict subject matter that was deemed "Indigenous" and culturally significant. They would paint new contact subject matter, like sailing vessels, buffalo, and firearms, in addition to their own spiritual stories. After first contact in Oenpelli in 1925, Aboriginal artists continue to transform and innovate rock art, showing it as a recurring means of expression and transmission of identity and cross-cultural knowledge. They prove as counter-colonial narratives to the dominant European story, while also showing small, vital moments of interaction and history.

With Nadjamerrek, he is considered to be one of the most prominent Aboriginal artists, cultural leaders, and a mentor to contemporary artist, whose tradition is steeped in the rock art tradition. He is the only artist documented to have articulated the contexts of his rock art creation. He would go into an incredible amount of detail, such as when, where, and why he created his rock art works." With his father and grandfather being prominent rock painters, he wanted to develop his own rock art language. Coming back to his Mother's country, "he painted two goat figures and a firearm in the Nakurlkboy shelter, located near today’s Kamarrkawarn outstation (see Fig. 1). He explained the motivation for these figures: “I saw it at Maranboy, and when I returned, I painted it. The children had never seen one, nor had the old people. They didn’t know what a goat was at all."

He depicted his Mother's moiety stories and Dreamings of her Country. He reflects his subjects with striking realism and naturalism, yet his main priority was always education. With both historical and contemporary (contact) depictions, he wanted to transform the unfamiliar into being familiar. His works were thus very didactic, trying to convey their experience with a subject despite another group not sharing the same experience. He made his works as universal as possible. He incorporated his cultural knowledge through narratives and designs, as well as sometimes incorporating the new pieces of culture introduced through Contact. Nadjamerrek was seen as a middleman, or someone who worked as a cultural mediator. In order to keep his position of pristine cultural knowledge as a senior artist, he often did not include Contact objects. He felt responsible for protecting the integrity of the Dreaming and Country stories of his family moieties. However, rock art is a constant negotiation, with different artists using different tools and techniques to create a different dialogue with rock art and contact interactions.

=== Comparison ===
In comparison to a concurrent painter, Nadjamerrek and Yirawala demonstrate different ways in which to depict a Dreaming, especially being that they are from different country. Yirawala was a famous bark painter who brought ceremonial power to bear in his paintings through his use of cross-hatching. He would fill the entire space through manipulation of the serpent, filling the canvas with the sacred body painting designs and emphasizing power and dynamism. However, Nadjamerrek's use of rarrk was single line, protecting the sacred clan designs from the balanda (the non-initiated members). Nadjamerrek blends the traditional motif with an innovative landscape approach, making the spiritual and ecological come together. Nadjamerrek takes a more didactic and instructive approach, while Yirawala took more creative liberties in terms of the shape and interpretation of the Kunwinjku motif. It is clear how Nadjamerrek focused on the educational aspects, with his bark paintings meant to be seen by the Antipodean viewer, not putting the Contact and colonizing perspective to the center of their works and preserving their meanings.

== Later artistic career ==
Bardayal Nadjamerrek is widely regarded as one of the greatest figurative Indigenous Artists by outsiders, but within his community he is highly recognized as a pioneering contemporary artist. In 1969, he formally began his artistic career painting at the Church Mission Society's Oenpelli mission under the linguist Peter Carroll. While this was the beginning of his professional career, Bardayal had decades of experience observing rock-art galleries and his elders. He became one of the main artists as the mission expanded the art market.

In the late 1950s Najamerrek moved to the Western Arnhem Land community of Gunbalanya (Oenpelli), bringing along his young family. Here he began to paint on bark in the public domain in 1969. The area borders on Kakadu National Park, a world heritage reserve famous for the countless rock art sites that date back at least twenty thousand years. Nadjamerrek's work aimed to draw out the connection between ancient rock art and modern bark painting and between the old way of living and the new. He established himself as a master painter, using a single parallel line hatching technique not commonly used by Western Arnhem Land artists.

Over his career, Bardayal Nadjamerrek has experimented with iconographic elements for maximum artistic and symbolic effect. For instance, one of his best known pieces, Ngalyod-The Rainbow Serpent, a large mural, depicts Ngalyod as a combination of animals with the body of a snake, the head of a crocodile, and the tail of a fish, with water lilies on its back. This combination of animals holds much significance. On one hand, it pays reference to Ngalyod's status as the ‘mother of all species’, but in another sense it references balancing the iconic with the transformative. In the Dreaming, Ngalyod was said to assume a range of different forms, morphing from one into another. Ngalyod is an example of Nadjamerrek's art style, with X-ray and rarrk styles as well as traits unique to his art such as triangle and diamond patterns formed from singular hatching.

Bardayal Nadjamerrek was awarded the Telstra Work on Paper Award in the 16th National Aboriginal & Torres Strait Islander Art Awards, 1999, for his work Ngalyangdoh.

In 2005, reproductions of Nadjamerrek's work, Kangaroo began appearing online with a statement claiming that upon successful sales, royalties would be paid to the artist. Upon investigation by pro-bono investigators and lawyers, it was discovered that the seller proclaimed to have a copyright license from Nadjamerrek. However, when Nadjamerrek and his daughter were spoken to about the license, Nadjamerrek, who does not read or write English, believed it to be a receipt for the sale of the painting and did not have the license adequately explained to him. The case was ultimately resolved after Bardayal's passing, but was found in favor of the artist because the seller was taking advantage of his limited English ability.

Nadjamerrek continued his bark paintings through the later half of his life, perfecting his craft and style with cultural ties before finally retiring from painting in the late 2000s.

== Painting and style ==
He was highly influenced by various styles, including his father's and relatives’ artworks and those more ancient from the Kunwinjku people rock art and “mimih” spirits. Many of Bardayals paintings are reminiscent or even replicas of art found on the rock walls from hundreds of years prior. His work, however, is incredibly original stylistically and in quality.

Bardayal painted using natural pigments and ochres, traditional stylistic elements of Aboriginal art, on a few different mediums, including Eucalyptus bark, paper, and canvas. His style resembled that of rock painting from the paintings of his ancestors found in the landscape. By the late 1980s, he had perfected his style both resembling his culture and his own personal take. Most of the work by Bardayal experiments with iconographic figures, such as the Ngalyod or Rainbow Serpent and other animals significant in Aboriginal culture. For example, he paints freshwater crocodiles, kangaroos, rock possums, emus, sugar gliders, and frilled-necked lizards. These images painted are different from other Indigenous artists in the way that they are not just static. Bardayal's style of painting portrays these images in a narrative way creating a dynamic tension and feeling of movement captured in time. For example, the way he paints makes it seem like people are singing or animals are leaping which makes his paintings very lively.

Lofty's work is distinguished by high quality, intricacy, and fineness of his parallel line hatching. His medium involves rectangular bark with either a red or black background. Lofty Nadjamerrek does not use crosshatching but rather fine parallel line work. He is not allowed to do crosshatching because it is a sacred Mardayin hatching. Because of its associations with the Mardayin ceremony and the meanings reserved only for the initiated, he said, "I can't cut that cross-rarrk. I'm not allowed. That's sacred Mardayin crosshatching ... So I keep doing it that old fashioned kind of rarrk, just like the old people used to do in the rock paintings." He often uses the X-ray technique, which shows the internal organs and spines on his figures and animals. This is a traditional way of showing that these are not mere pictures but real beings. His depictions of animals often invoke a sense of movement. He paints animals, humans, and vegetation with great detail, including many small details on feet, paws, and leaping stances. Many of his bark paintings depict different animal species from western Arnhem Land, including crocodiles, birds, kangaroos, fish, and turtles.

Nadjamerrek's art's single line rarrk style, unlike those that followed who relied on the more modern cross-hatching technique. His rejection of cross hatching solidified his distinction as one of the few great elder artists of Western Arnhem Land. However, he was aware on how they were painted and about their significance. He routinely attended regional spiritual ceremonies and learned to paint complex crosshatched designs and body designs on skin. Attending these ceremonies shaped his artistic development, yet he remained strict to his use of single-line rarrk and x-ray motifs.

Bardayal's work is still hung in dozens of galleries in Australia, continually teaching those about the culture and traditions of Aboriginal clans. Bardayal is regarded today as one of the greatest rock-art style painters of his time.

== Well known paintings ==
One of Bardayal's best known paintings is Ngalyod — The Rainbow Serpent, a large mural in the Darwin International Airport where many travellers can view it. He portrays Ngalyod as having a body of a snake, crocodile head, and a fish tail. Ngalyod is not only the mother of all species but can transform forms.

Another well known painting is Yawk Yawk, a depiction of female water spirits. Bardayal illustrates the yawkyawk in a new way that is different from the traditional images. Instead of having legs on land and a fish tail in the water, he paints legs inside of the fish tail. He is creating dynamic tension, creating a sense of transformation.

Other paintings of his are Two Goannas painted in 1970 with ochres on bark, Ceremony with women taking part also painted in 1970 with ochres on bark, and Kabirriyalyolme painted in 2003 with natural pigments on paper.

== John W. Kluge Commission ==
In May 1991, Nadjamerrek was in Injalak Arts and began working on paper to participate in the commission of works by senior artists at Gunbalanya. John W. Kluge wanted to record and preserve the painted images to represent the various aspects of the Kunwinjku people, which stemmed from a fear in part of its erasure and culture loss. Nadjamerrek contributed 6/45 of the completed works. This involved Nadjamerrek involving himself and being willing to try new things. Bark paintings tend to not be the easiest to transport or keep, due to the organic uses of bark and natural ochre pigments. Paper before was not seen as being a worthy enough material in which to place their clan designs and stories. He embraced the newly introduced large sheets of paper and fine materials to paint more detailed compositions. He wanted to represent the Kunwinjku cosmology and spiritual stories and motifs in a way not done before. He did know that no balanda would ever understand the interconnections and meanings behind the cosmology of his works, yet the educated Kunwinjku would understand his totalizing message.

After the commission, Nadjamerrek actually began to prefer painting with his earth ochre pigments on paper to be his principle medium. It also allowed him to create art not just during the dry seasons, as well as a steady stream of income, as the paper was easiest to sell and market. However, he often felt forced because of these reasons to produce work even when he did not have any inspiration. He was able to paint different icons and topics due to his breadth of knowledge as a ceremonial leader. The commission inspired Nadjamerrek to continue to make his images more complex. Before, he would only really depict one Ancestral story at a time, yet Kluge's commission inspired the increasing amount of figures, stories, and totalizing characteristics.

== Late life ==
Nadjamerrek retired from formal painting in the last few years of his life, yet was still active in his community and practicing his craft with younger members of his clan. He spent his days passing down information to future generations about their culture and rock art. Similar to many well-known western Arnhem Land artists, Nadjamerrek taught one of his sons how to paint by a traditional informal apprenticeship. He uses art as a basis for all his teachings. From his career documenting and painting rock art, he inspired many to travel to the region and formally document the paintings and culture of their ancestors to be preserved and taught to others in greater Australia. His legacy continues to be a source of inspiration for many people in the Western Arnhem Land region. Bardayal remained eager to share his knowledge to Balanda (non-Aboriginal people) and Bininj (young indigenous people) to ensure the safety and preservation of the stories of his ancestors and cultural traditions. From a young age, this is something that he was passionate about in a family of artists. He would initiate creating artworks for teaching purposes. He once said that “They used to teach these stories to the children. Sometimes someone would go hunting and, upon their return, they would tell a story about what happened, and the children would say, 'paint it for me!' Parents wanted to explain things to their children." He also worked with a variety of different professions, like art historians, botanists, anthropologists, zoologists, and other researches, using his own images to inform the stories that he passed onto these curious researchers.

As he aged, Nadjamerrek's rarrk loosened and inevitably changed. However, he remained and expressive and passionate storyteller regardless. In 2008, Nadjamerrek had retired from painting, but his final works were included in the exhibition Continuity: Culture, Country and Family at Mossenson Galleries in Melbourne. His pieces hung alongside those of his son Freddie Nadjamerrek, son-in-law Gabriel Maralngurra, and grandchildren Gavin Namarnyilk, Maath Maralngurra, Allan Nadjamerrek, Ray Nadjamerrek, and Simone Nadjamerrek.

Nadjamerrek died in 2009.

== Collections ==
- Artbank, Sydney
- Australian Museum, Sydney
- Aboriginal Arts Board of the Australia Council, held by the National Museum of Australia in Canberra
- Berndt Museum of Anthropology, University of Western Australia
- Kluge-Ruhe Aboriginal Art Collection, University of Virginia
- Museum and Art Gallery of the Northern Territory, Darwin
- Museum of Contemporary Art, Arnott's Collection, Sydney
- National Gallery of Australia, Canberra
- National Gallery of Victoria, Melbourne
- The Holmes a Court Collection, Perth
- University of Queensland

== Selected exhibitions ==
- 1975, “Australian Bark Painting”, From the Collection of Dr. Edward Ruhe (touring USA).
- 1982, “Aboriginal Art at the Top”, Museum and Art Gallery of the Northern Territory, Darwin.
- 1983, “Artists of Arnhem Land”, Canberra School of Arts, Canberra.
- 1984, “Kunwinjku Bim – Western Arnhem Land Paintings”, From the Collection of the Aboriginal Arts Board, National Gallery of Victoria.
- 1984, “The 1st annual National Aboriginal and Torres Strait Islander Art Award Exhibition”, Museum and Art Gallery of the Northern Territory, Darwin.
- 1985, “The 2nd annual National Aboriginal and Torres Strait Islander Art Award Exhibition”, Museum and Art Gallery of the Northern Territory, Darwin.
- 1986, “The 3rd annual National Aboriginal and Torres Strait Islander Art Award Exhibition”, Museum and Art Gallery of the Northern Territory, Darwin.
- 1986, “The Art of the First Australians”, Kobe City Museum Japan.
- 1987, “The 4th annual National Aboriginal and Torres Strait Islander Art Award Exhibition”, Museum and Art Gallery of the Northern Territory, Darwin.
- 1988, “Aboriginal Art of the Top End”, National Gallery of Victoria, Melbourne.
- 1988, “The Inspired Dream”, Museum and Gallery of the Northern Territory (touring internationally).
- 1990, “The 7th annual National Aboriginal and Torres Strait Islander Art Award Exhibition”, Museum and Art Gallery of the Northern Territory, Darwin.
- 1992, “The 9th annual National Aboriginal and Torres Strait Islander Art Award Exhibition”, Museum and Art Gallery of the Northern Territory, Darwin.
- 1993, 1994 “Power of the Land - Masterpieces of Aboriginal Art”, National Gallery of Victoria, Melbourne.
- 1993, Editions, Southbank, Melbourne.
- 1993, “The 10th annual National Aboriginal and Torres Strait Islander Art Award Exhibition”, Museum and Art Gallery of the Northern Territory, Darwin.
- 1994, Aboriginal and Tribal Art Gallery, Sydney.
- 1994, “The 11th annual National Aboriginal and Torres Strait Islander Art Award Exhibition”, Museum and Art Gallery of the Northern Territory, Darwin.
- 1995, “Moon, Rainbow and Sugarbag – The art of Mick Kubarkku, Bardayal Nadjamerrek”, Museum and Art Gallery of the Northern Territory, Darwin (touring nationally).
- 1995, “The 12th annual National Aboriginal and Torres Strait Islander Art Award Exhibition”, Museum and Art Gallery of the Northern Territory, Darwin.
- 1996, Framed Gallery, Darwin.
- 1998, “The 15th annual National Aboriginal and Torres Strait Islander Art Awards, Museum and Art Gallery of the Northern Territory, Darwin.
- 1999, Framed Gallery, Darwin.
- 1999, “The 16th annual National Aboriginal and Torres Strait islander Art Award Exhibition”, Museum and Art Gallery of the Northern Territory, Darwin.
- 2003, “New Works”, Annandale Gallery, Sydney.
- 2004, "Lofty Bardayal Nadjamerrek: New work on bark", Annandale Galleries, Sydney.
- 2006, “Bardayal ‘Lofty’ Nadjamerrek Late Works”, Annandale Gallery, Sydney.
