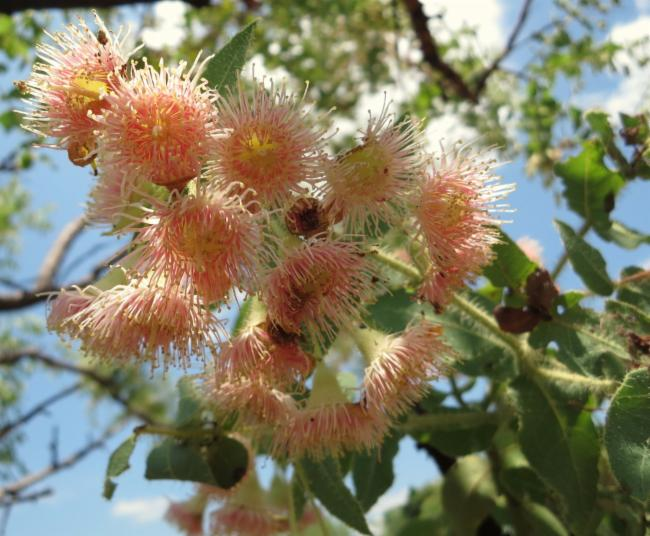
- Corymbia dunlopiana near Edith Falls

Scientific classification
- Kingdom: Plantae
- Clade: Embryophytes
- Clade: Tracheophytes
- Clade: Spermatophytes
- Clade: Angiosperms
- Clade: Eudicots
- Clade: Rosids
- Order: Myrtales
- Family: Myrtaceae
- Genus: Corymbia
- Species: C. dunlopiana

Binomial name
- Corymbia dunlopiana K.D.Hill & L.A.S.Johnson

Synonyms
- Eucalyptus dunlopiana (K.D.Hill & L.A.S.Johnson) Brooker

= Corymbia dunlopiana =

Dunlop's bloodwood

Species of plant

Corymbia dunlopiana, commonly known as Dunlop's bloodwood, bongonyin, or Oenpelli bloodwood, is a species of tree that is endemic to the Northern Territory. It has rough bark on the trunk and branches, a crown of sessile, juvenile leaves arranged in opposite pairs, flower buds solitary or in groups of three, red flowers and urn-shaped fruit.

== Description ==
Corymbia dunlopiana is a tree that typically grows to a height of 7 metres (23 ft) and often has twisted irregular branches. The bark is rough, tessellated or flaky and grey-brown over reddish-brown. The branchlets, leaves and flower-buds are all rough and hairy. Young plants and coppice regrowth have sessile, heart-shaped to elliptical leaves that are 40–125 mm (1.6–4.9 in) long and 30–80 mm (1.2–3.1 in) wide with a rounded or stem-clasping base. The crown of the tree has only juvenile leaves that are sessile, heart-shaped or lance-shaped to oblong, 35–120 mm (1.4–4.7 in) long and 20–57 mm (0.79–2.24 in) wide and arranged in opposite pairs with a stem-clasping base. The leaves are the same shade of dull, yellow-green, light green to grey-green on both sides. The flower buds are arranged in leaf axils or on the ends of branchlets on a branched peduncle up to 4 mm (0.16 in) long, each branch of the peduncle with one, three or (rarely) seven buds on pedicels 4–35 mm (0.16–1.38 in) long. Mature buds are pear-shaped, 12–20 mm (0.47–0.79 in) long and 7–10 mm (0.28–0.39 in) wide with a beaked operculum. Flowering has been observed in most months but mostly from the end of the dry season to early in the wet season.

== Taxonomy and naming ==
Corymbia dunlopiana was first formally described in 1995 by Ken Hill and Lawrie Johnson from specimens collected near Pine Creek in 1985. The specific epithet (dunlopiana) honours Clyde R. Dunlop, a Northern Territory botanist. "Bongonyin" is the name given to the species in the Wagiman language.

== Distribution and habitat ==
The range of C. dunlopiana extends from west of Katherine to the Daly River and as far east as near Jim Jim in open savannah woodland. It prefers rising ground, outcrops and ridges usually with skeletal soils and often forms pure stands of small, twisted, shrubby individuals.

== See also ==
- List of Corymbia species
