= Oenpelli Airport =

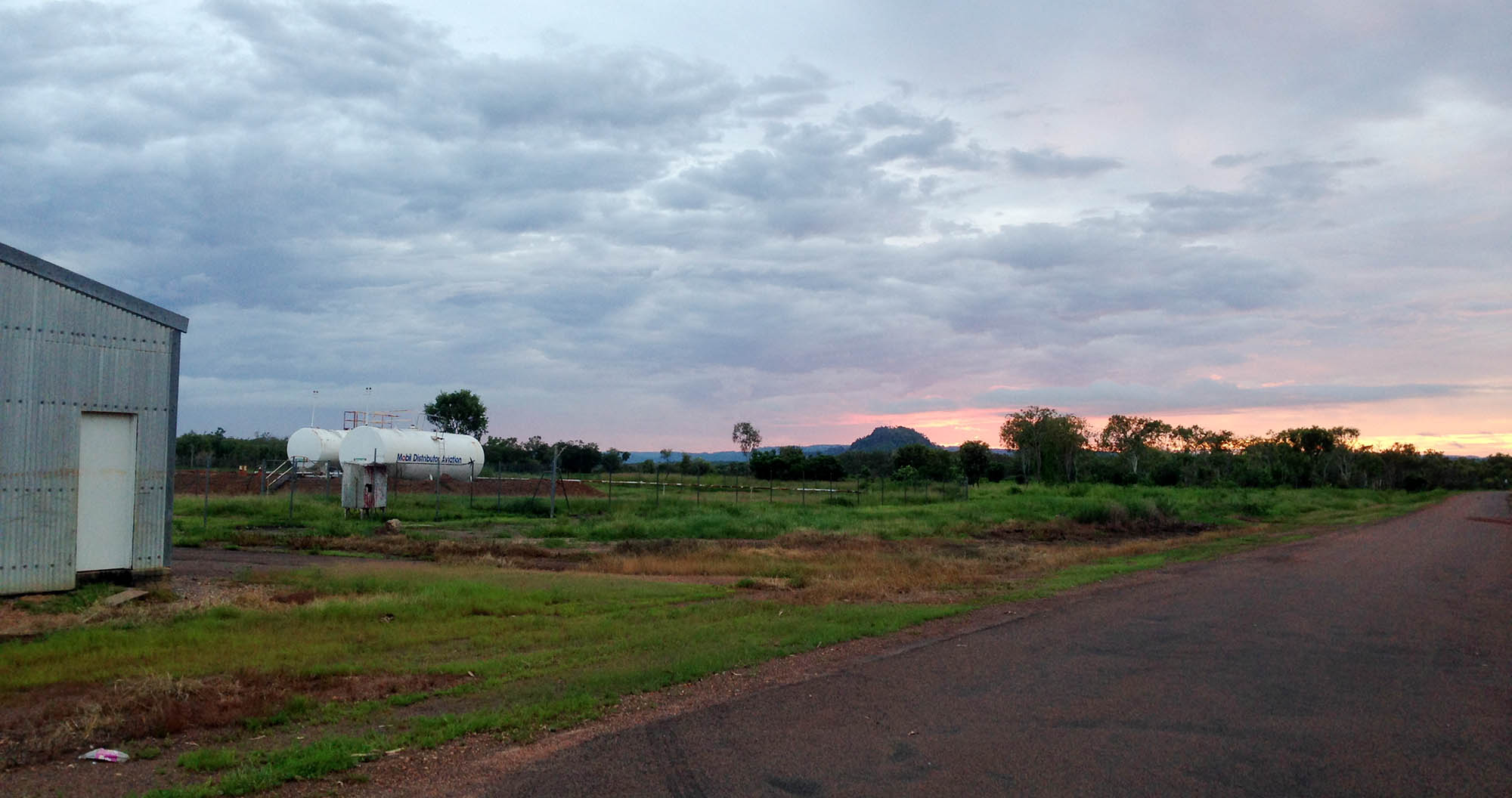
- IATA: OPI; ICAO: YOEN

Summary
- Airport type: Public
- Operator: West Arnhem Regional Council
- Location: Gunbalanya, Northern Territory
- Elevation AMSL: 30 ft / 9 m
- Coordinates: 12°19′30″S 133°00′18″E

Map
- Location in Northern Territory

Runways
Direction	Length		Surface
Direction	m	ft	Surface
41,273	1,320	4,331	Asphalt
- Sources: Australian AIP

Oenpelli Airport (IATA: OPI, ICAO: YOEN) is located in Gunbalanya (formerly known as Oenpelli), Northern Territory, Australia
