= X-ray style art =

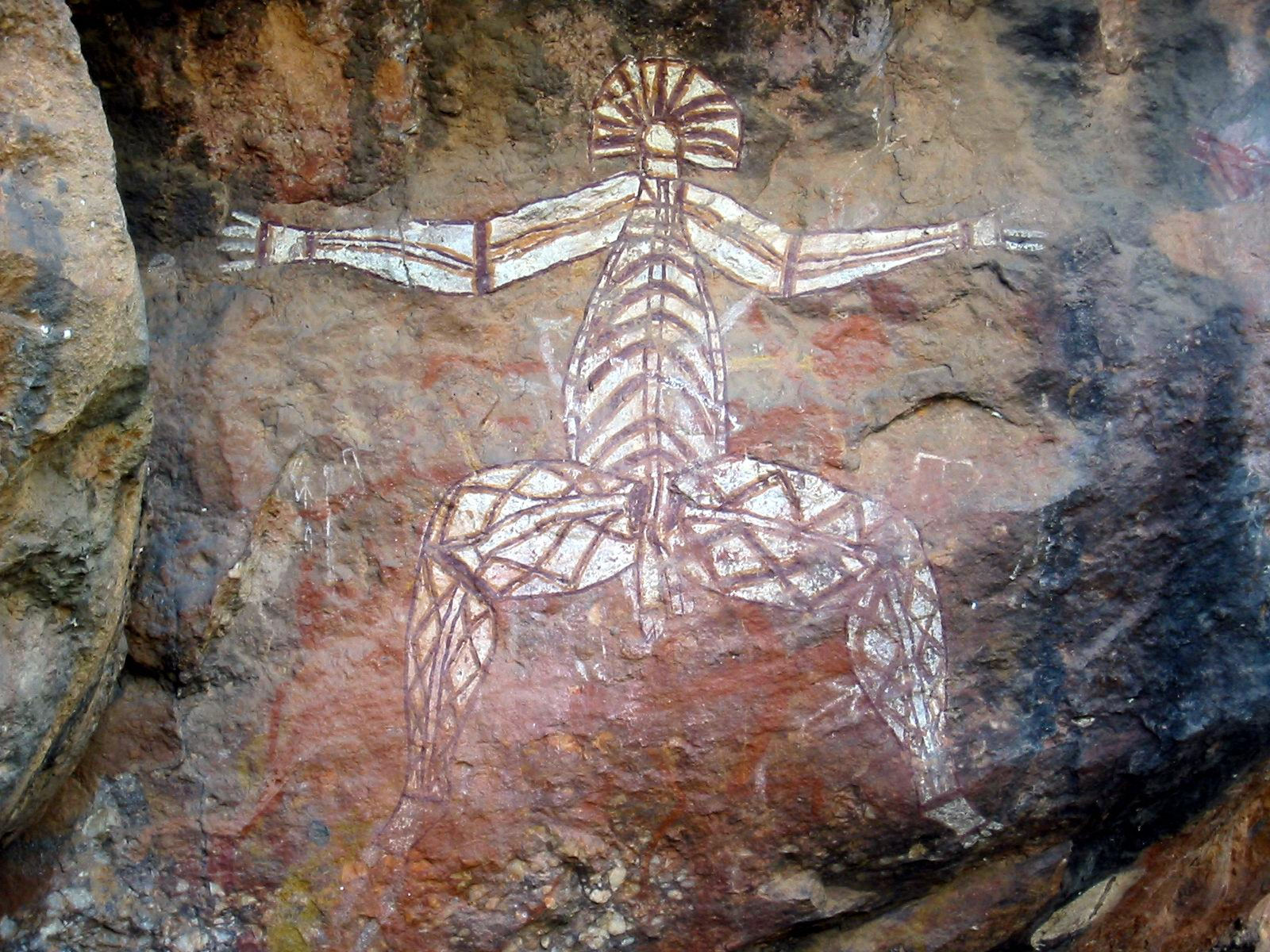
Example of x ray style art found in Aboriginal art in Australia

X-ray style art, sometimes referred to as just X-ray style or X-ray art, is a prehistoric art form in which animals (and humans) are depicting by drawing or painting the skeletal frame and internal organs.

The style may date as far back as c. 8000 BC in the Mesolithic (rock) art of northern Europe. By c. 2000 BC it (apparently) spread to Africa, South Asia, and Australia where it is most commonly found today and specimens have been dated as early as 4600–3000 BC. However, it has also been found in hunting cultures of (Northern spain), Siberia, the Arctic Circle, North America, western New Guinea, New Ireland, India, and Malaysia.

The most common subject of X-ray style art is fish (due to its importance in the diet of Aboriginal Australians); however, it also includes many other animals, humans, and mythical creatures, including figures as long as 8 feet (2.5 metres).
