= Kunwinjku dialect =

Australian Aboriginal language

Kunwinjku
- Gunwinggu
- Native to: Australia
- Region: Northern Territory
- Ethnicity: Bininj (Kunwinjku etc.)
- Native speakers: 1,494 (2021 census)
- Language family: Arnhem: Gunwinyguan; Gunwinggic; Bininj Kunwok; Kunwinjku

Language codes
- ISO 639-3: –
- Glottolog: guma1252
- AIATSIS: N65 Kunwinjku
- Kunwinjku is classified as Vulnerable by the UNESCO Atlas of the World's Languages in Danger.

Kunwinjku is a dialect of Bininj Kunwok, an Australian Aboriginal language. The Aboriginal people who speak Kunwinjku are the Bininj people, who live primarily in western Arnhem Land. As Kunwinjku is the most widely spoken dialect of Bininj Kunwok, 'Kunwinjku' is sometimes used to refer to Bininj Kunwok as a whole. Kunwinjku is spoken primarily in the west of the Bininj Kunwok speaking areas, including the town of Gunbalanya, as well as outstations such as Mamardawerre, Kumarrirnbang, Kudjekbinj and Manmoyi.
