= Mimi (folklore) =

Fairy-like beings in Aboriginal Australian folklore

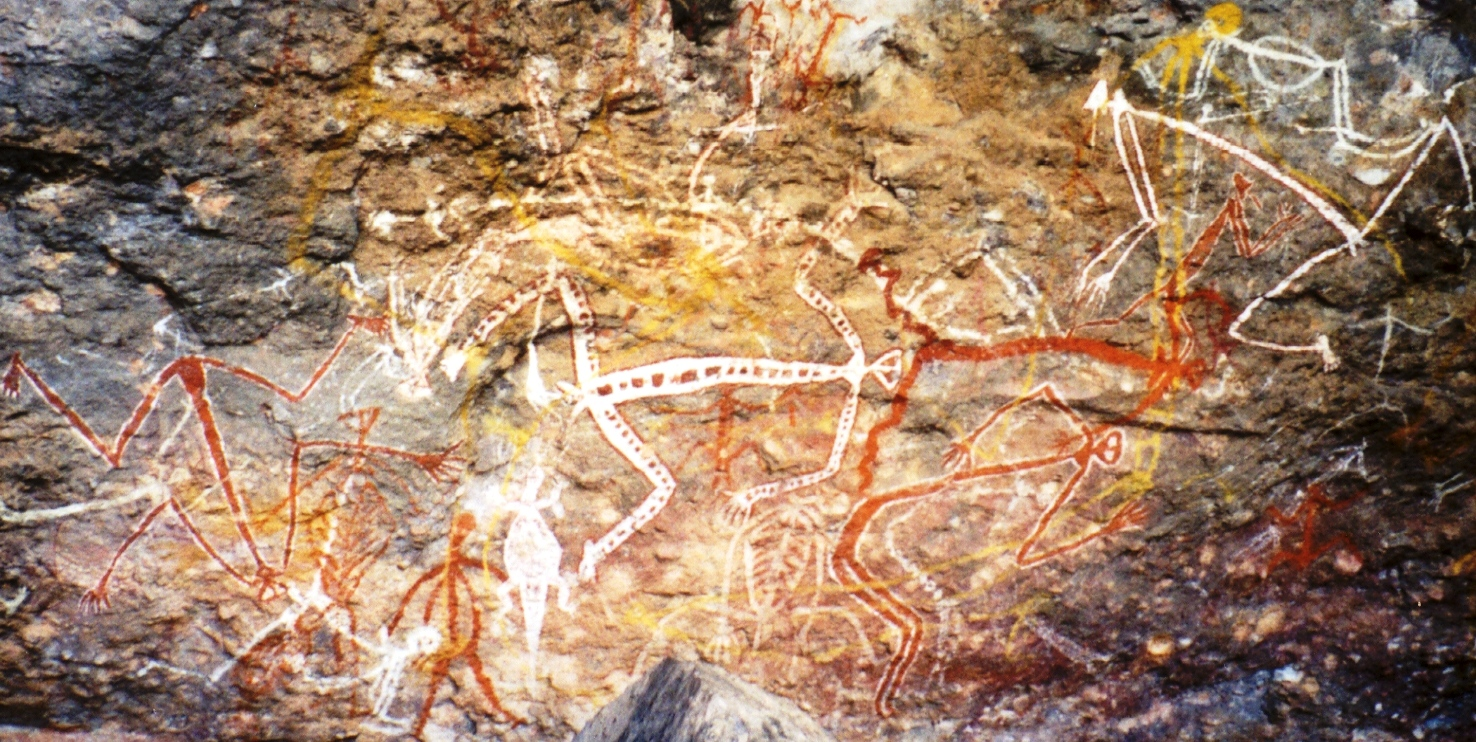
Aboriginal rock painting of Mimi spirits in the Anbangbang gallery at Nourlangie Rock

Mimis (or Mimih spirits) are fairy-like beings of Arnhem Land in the folklore of the Aboriginal Australians of northern Australia. They are described as having extremely thin and elongated bodies, so thin as to be in danger of breaking in case of a high wind. To avoid this, they usually spend most of their time living in rock crevices.

According to Aboriginal folklore, Mimi had human form and made the first rock paintings before the Aboriginal people first came to northern Australia. The Mimi taught the Aboriginal people how to paint, and how to hunt and cook kangaroo meat. The Mimis are considered to be mischievous but generally harmless.

== See also ==
- Wight
- Fairy
- Nymph
- Huldufólk
- Basajaun
- Landvættir
- Green Man
- Wild man
- Leshy
