= Kunwinjku people =

Australian Aboriginal people of West Arnhem Land

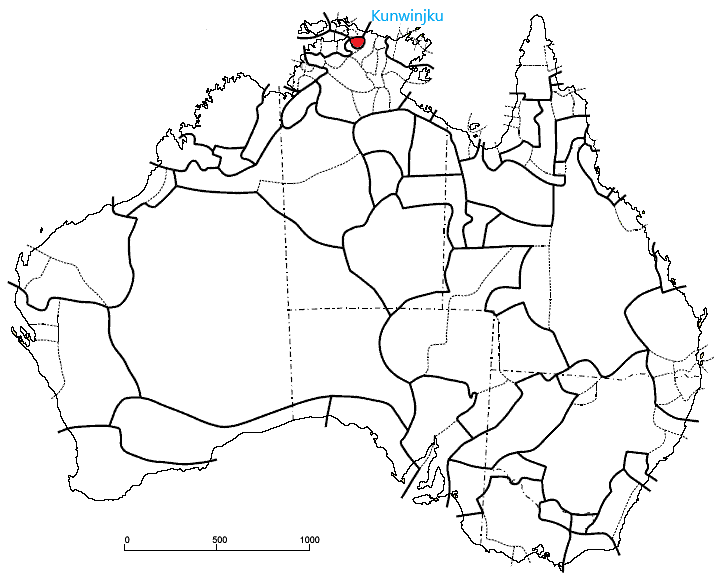
The lands of the Kunwinjku people in the Northern Territory

The Kunwinjku (formerly written Gunwinggu) people are an Australian Aboriginal people, one of several groups within the Bininj people, who live around West Arnhem Land to the east of Darwin, Northern Territory. Kunwinjku people generally refer to themselves as "Bininj" (meaning people, or Aboriginal people) in much the same way that Yolŋu people refer to themselves as "Yolŋu".

== Language ==
They traditionally speak the Kunwinjku language.

== Country ==
Their original heartland is said to have been in the hilly terrain south of Goulburn Island and their frontier with the Maung running just south of Tor Rock. Their northern extension approached Sandy Creek, while they were also present south-east at the head of Cooper's Creek and part of the King River. In Norman Tindale's scheme, the Kunwinjku were allotted a tribal territory of around 2,800 square miles (7,300 km^{2}) in the area south of Jungle Creek and on the headwaters of the East Alligator River. The Gumader swamps near Junction Bay and the creeks east of Oenpelli/Awunbelenja (now Gunbalanya) also formed part of their land.

== Alternative names ==
- Gunwinggu
- Gunwingu
- Gunwingo
- Wengi, Wengei, Wengej
- Gundeidjeme
- Gundjeipmi
- Kulunglutji, Kulunglutchi
- Gundjeibmi, Gundjajeimi, Gundeijeme, Gundeidjeme
- Margulitban
- Unigangk, Urnigangg (Note: Tindale's source, Arthur Capell, actually wrote Uningangk)
- Koorungo
- Neinggu/Neiŋgu (Maung exonym)
- Mangaridji
- Mangeri (Note: Again Capell uses Mangeri to denote a distinct language group from the Gunwinggu)

== Customs ==
Dzamalag was a form of ritualised ceremonial exchange or bartering practised by the Gunwinggu people.

== Sources ==
- Capell, Arthur (June 1942). "Languages of Arnhem Land, North Australia". Oceania. 12 (4): 364–392. doi:10.1002/j.1834-4461.1942.tb00365.x. JSTOR 40327959.
- Elkin, A. P.; Berndt, R. M.; Berndt, C. H. (June 1951). "Social Organization of Arnhem Land". Oceania. 21 (4): 253–301. doi:10.1002/j.1834-4461.1951.tb00176.x. JSTOR 40328302.
- Garde, Murray. "bininj". Bininj Kunwok Online dictionary. Bininj Kunwok Regional Language Centre.
- Hiatt, L. R. (1965). Kinship and conflict: a study of an aboriginal community in northern Arnhem Land (PDF). Australian National University Press.
- Mathews, R. H. (1900). "Marriage and descent among the Australian aborigines". Journal of the Proceedings of the Royal Society of New South Wales. 34: 120–135. doi:10.5962/p.359341. S2CID 259735456.
- Spencer, Baldwin (1914). Native tribes of the Northern Territory of Australia (PDF). London: Macmillan Publishers.
- Spencer, Baldwin (1928). Wanderings in wild Australia (PDF). London: Macmillan Publishers.
- Tindale, Norman Barnett (1974). "Gunwinggu (NT)". Aboriginal Tribes of Australia: Their Terrain, Environmental Controls, Distribution, Limits, and Proper Names. Australian National University. ISBN 978-0-708-10741-6. Archived from the original on 20 March 2020.
- Warner, W. Lloyd (1937). Black civilization: a social study of an Australian tribe. Harper & Brothers.
