= Mick Kubarkku =

Aboriginal Australian artist

- Born: c.1922 near Maningrida, Northern Territory, Australia
- Died: 2008

Mick Kubarkku (c. 1922 – 2008) (also spelled Gubarrgu) was regarded as a prominent Aboriginal Australian artist most associated with Kuninjku modernism.

== Biography ==
Mick Kubarkku was born near the Mann and Liverpool River Districts about 50 kilometers south of Maningrida in c. 1922. He grew up in the absence of European influence in the rock-shelters in the Mann River District. His secluded upbringing led him to be one of the few remaining people to have recollections of painting methods for traditional rock art paintings done by elder clan members. Mick Kubarkku died 16 May 2008.

Mick Kubarkku grew up in a nomadoc lifestyle, traveling all across Western Arnhem land and rotating through small outstations of civilization. He has painted from a very young age, learning his skills and knowledge from his father, Ngindjalakku. This nomad travel would take place between his father's homeland of Kulmarru and his mother's homeland Kardbam Country. However, on when the war began, he was sent with his brothers to the Milingimbi Mission. After the war, he returned to Australia and relocated to Oenpelli to work at Buffalo shooter camps. Shortly following this, he relocated to Maningrida in 1957 when it was newly settled by the government.

Kubarkku was one of the first painters in this area, beginning a long-standing tradition of art in the new area. His work began to gain traction in markets after the creation of Maningrida Arts and Culture in 1969. Kubarkku delved into the art of Mimih and other spirits in the 1970s. His depictions of these spirits were notable because he diverged from the normal thin and spindly representations of the Mimih and instead painted them strong spirits that resembled the rocks they sprang from. Later in his life, Kubarkku began to depict these spirits in a new medium, carvings. These carvings were three dimensional, creating a sculpture like art.

In his later years, Kubarkku remained a highly respected elder artist in the western Arnhem Land art movement. He lived with his family at Yirkarrakkal, his remote outstation, where he passed along his skills and helped them flourish as artists under his guidance.

Mick Kubarkku died in 2008. His daughter Marina Murdilnga is a fiber artist and also works through the Maningrida Arts and Culture Centre.

== Career ==
At the age of 15, Kubarkku was taught the cultural significance and crafting techniques for sacred clan designs by his father. The ease in which he picked up these techniques were noticed by the elder clan members and he was allowed to participate in painting rarrk for the Madayin ceremony on rock shelters. Despite his early exposure to painting, he did not continue as a full-time painter until 1957, when he settled in the newly established government settlement of Maningrida. Kubarkku became one of the first Kuninjku artists to register at the Maningrida arts centre.

Kubarkku initially began creating paintings for sacred cultural ceremonies, but he later shifted to selling his work through the government-founded township known as Maningrida.

His early paintings used a dotted infill technique that was reminiscent of the rock art he was accustomed to seeing in his youth. The homeland movement is regarded as the third period of Kuninjki modernism and is marked by the move from traditional rock art elements to the use of sacred designs in the artwork. Kubarkku was one of the first prominent artists to partake in the homeland movement during the 1970s. This movement can be seen in his work as his style transitioned from rock art influence to the inclusion of more sacred elements such as the cross hatching motif often used in the Mardayin ceremony.

Other prominent motifs in his work include abstracted rarrk, Mimi spirits, and totemic animals such as the turtle, kangaroo, and echidna. Outside of painting, Kubarkku did wood carvings which usually depicted Mimi and Yawk Yawk.

In 1995, Kubarrku was the subject of a major touring exhibition, Rainbow, Sugarbag and Moon, along with his contemporary Bardayal 'Lofty' Nadjamerrek. The exhibition was curated by Margie West for the Museum and Art Gallery of the Northern Territory.

By the time he died in May 2008, Kubarkku had been infirm for many years, and the last of his works of art were created in the early 2000s. He produced very few works in general after 1995, when he was celebrated alongside Lofty Bardayal Nadjamerrek in the exhibition Rainbow, sugarbag and moon, which was curated by Margie West, who was the curator of Aboriginal art and material culture at the Museum and Art Gallery of the Northern Territory at the time.

=== Aboriginal art market ===
There is a long history of bark paintings in Western Arnhem Land. Some of the more ancient bark paintings are no longer with us. Most pieces were originally made for ceremonial purposes and then discarded soon after. Keeping these paintings was not a major priority for the members of the Arnhem Land community when they were first created, partially due to the inconvenience of keeping them with their nomadic lifestyle. It is evident that this attitude towards bark paintings has drastically changed over the years, and a greater appreciation for their importance has been highlighted. In the early 1960s, a more youthful aspect of bark paintings started to emerge when artists such as Yirawala became recognized. Yirawala had a new sense of inventiveness that changed the game for many future Aboriginal artists. He was later deemed the "Picasso of Arnhem Land." By the late 1970s and 1980s, other prominent artists such as Bardayal "Lofty" Nadjamerrek, Mick Kubarkku and George Milpurrurru began painting on a much more grand scale in order to accommodate for the market in Aboriginal art. Mick Kubarkku, along with various other artists such as John Mawurndjul, are credited with creating some of the largest Aboriginal bark paintings of all time.

== The processes of painting ==
There are many different painting techniques that are required to successfully create traditional Aboriginal art styles. A very common element in these bark paintings is the use of rarrk. Senior artists often require the help from more novice painters when creating this tedious rarrk design. In order to paint the rarrk design, a special paint brush is required. This extremely fine paint brush is made from the long central fibers in the water reed called manyilk. It is crucial for the artist to have a steady hand when painting the rarrk design, which can be much harder for the senior artists. This slow and careful process is called yalmo work. Many senior artists have been forced to retire the skill of painting rarrk due to the difficulty of pure steadiness. For example, Mick Kubarkku recalls the time when he was younger and first learning how to create the traditional rarrk design. "I saw my father doing the rarrk for the Mardayin ceremony and tried to do it myself with my back all doubled over, I ended up being better than any of them at it. They gave me a job in the Mardayin ceremony to paint some rank. When they all saw me doing it they said 'wow', he's got the hang of it. 'You've left us behind my son,' they said to me (in Garde 1997: n.p.)." Mick Kubarrku was fifteen years old when he first learned the skill from his father, and he used this knowledge to teach future generations about the importance of rarrk and the ceremonial meanings behind it. Many of his works rely on fine cross hatching to constitute the rarrk. The highly esteemed pure white pigment used for fine cross hatching is collected by hand and said to be mined and traded from a sacred site. It's said to be the feces of the rainbow serpent, Ngalyod.

== Painting style ==
Kubarkku's distinguished works are recognizable by their combined usage of bands of traditional rarrk and accents of dotting. The dotting technique used by Kubarkku in his paintings and sculptures originated from the techniques and stylistic conventions of Arnhem Land rock art paintings. Following in the footsteps of the majority of Kuninjku artists, however, Kubarkku gradually shifted towards rarrk as his primary artistic device in his paintings over the course of his career.

Kubarkku carries on the cave-art tradition of some of the earliest painters in Aboriginal Australia while bringing his own distinct style to his work. His painting style is "rugged and individual", featuring his own style of cross hatching individual form the popular rarrk design. Many artists across Western Arnhem Land utilize this rarrk style in their pieces to illustrate the cultural importance of the Madayin ceremony. Yet, Kubarkku paints in a his cross-hatching in a looser design, utilizing an uneven form of lines emulating the rock marking found near where he lives.

The crosshatching are typically vertical and horizontal lines of no pattern, sloped across each other and interlaced with black dots. Kubarkku also primarily features figures in his work, adorned with large, uneven dots on the hands and feet, heads, and backbones. He also often features figures that have a white face completely covered in black dots and spirit figures with strongly angled joints. It is also common for him not to include facial features on his figures, particularly omitting eyes.

Reflecting his upbringing, in which he had relatively little contact with white people prior to the establishment of Maningrida after the Second World War, Kubarkku adhered to a traditionalist perspective when it came to his painting style. Like many of his peers from traditional Arnhem Land communities, Kubarkku learned about artistic and cultural knowledge from his father, Ngindjalakku. Kubarkku's art features a style that evokes traditional rock art paintings—a consistent pattern among many of his contemporaries such as Bardayal Nadjamerrek, Anchor Kulunba, Peter Marralwanga and Crusoe Kuningbal.

The content of his paintings is a continued tradition of the stories that the older cave-artists depicted. He features stories about various important Oenpelli sprits, including the important Mimih spirits and their emergence from the rock country to bring their influence to Western Arnhem Land. He also depicts important spirits and gods such as The Rainbow Serpent, Kodjok Bamdjelk, the pandanus spirit, and the lightning spirit.

Kubarkku worked with other mediums apart from just bark paintings, including three dimensional carvings that depicted mimih spirits, and Yawk Yawk mermaid spirits.Towards the end of his life, he also created paintings that showcased aspects of cosmology that were in line with Kunwinjku conventions.

=== Influence of Mick Kubarkku's upbringing on his work ===
Mick Kubarrku was born in the homelands of the Marrinji clan at Kukabarnka, and the culture he was surrounded with had minimal contact with other cultures aside from occasional trading and arrival of anthropologists. He was of the Dhuwa moiety, specifically Balang, and grew up in a very traditional Aboriginal way. He grew up in the rock shelters around the middle Mann River, which allowed him to learn extensively about the environment surrounding him. Like many Aboriginal boys, he was taught about the practices of his culture by his father, Ngindjalakku. His father also taught him how to paint, and he became involved in painting for sacred ceremonies well before he began painting anything for commercial purposes. His upbringing in ceremony was crucial to encouraging Kubarkku's painting. The painting done for ceremony is intricate, and rarrk is painted with a very fine brush that requires a very steady hand, and this alone causes many people to give up the practice. When Kubarrku first tried to paint, he did so because he saw his father painting rarrk for the Mardayin ceremony and he tried to copy what he saw his father doing. Even his very first attempt was impressive to his father and the others who saw his talent, and it greatly encouraged Kubarkku and helped him discover a great talent. This grounding in traditional ways of life and traditional intent for painting is reflected in the sacred patterns often featured in the figures in his bark paintings. His dedication to tradition is also apparent in his methods and materials, which are always natural and from the land around him.

=== Celestial elements ===
Later in his career, Kubarkku incorporated celestial elements into Kuninjku art with his signature Dird Djang (Moon Dreaming) paintings. These celestial works are credited with completing the Kuninjku artistic universe.

The night sky is often an important element in Indigenous Australian art, and the depiction of certain features of the night sky carries an ancestral and cultural significance. Particular Indigenous Australian artists are the custodians of ancestral narratives about the moon and the stars in the night sky, and Kubarkku is the custodian of one of these particular moon narratives alongside his nephew Paul Nabulumo. Kubarkku and his nephew are the custodians of the moon dreaming associated with a site called Dirdbim, in which the rainbow serpent Ngaloyd created a large hole in the sandstone outcrop at Dirdbim in the shape of the full moon. Kubarkku's Moon dreaming from Dirdbim (1995), which depicts this Dirdbim moon dreaming, was featured in the Sky/Earth art display in the Australian galleries from October 2018 to April 2019. The Sky/Earth display highlighted artistic explorations of the natural world and mankind's relationship with outer space and the cosmos.

== Learning from the elders ==
Mick Kubarkku recalls growing up being surrounded by painters and various artists in their own creation processes. Being surrounded by these experienced artists was a huge inspiration for Kubarkku, and he used these men as artistic mentors as he started to create art of his own. He remembers being visited by Jon Altman and given food from the stores as they camped out and worked for many hours together. When Jon visited these artists, (Mick Kuabrkku, Balang Jimmy, Djarrbbarali, and John Mawurndjul) he would create voice recordings to document their teachings and experience in the artistic process. This created a chain of education, so future generations of artists can listen to the voice recordings and continue the legacy of their traditional art practices. Mick Kubarkku states that he used to live with these older mentors, along with other young aspiring artists of his own generation. They would watch the mentors as they painted and observe the materials that they used. He recalls that they would only use white ochre to create the pigments in the white paint. They would never stray from this traditional resource, and they taught Kubarkku and the others how important it was to stay true to their roots. This community was a place for learning to flourish and for the bonds between the various artists to grow stronger. Eventually, they expanded their horizons by reaching out to the non-Aboriginal people (the Balanda world) and sharing their culture and painting practices with a greater audience. Kubarkku states that the artists entered into the Balanda world, but continued to create paintings about their own land.

=== Generational knowledge transfer ===
Mick Kubarkku describes how the people in his community primarily focus on depicting the djang (Dreaming) stories of their land. From one generation to the next, the stories continue to pass on. The ways in which the djang stories are depicted have varied. These pieces have been reworked and created by different artists with various life experiences and interpretations. Kubarkku states that even though these stories have been told in many different ways, they will always remain focused on Aboriginal subjects and sacred places. After these many years of learning and teaching the future generations, Kubarkku shares that he is now finished. When he was younger, he engaged with many different artists. Yet as he aged, he realized that his time as an artist had come to an end. He states that his eyes don't work like they used to, and that the younger generations have a greater ability to succeed. Not only was his time as a painter over, but he also felt unable to create carvings like he had in the years before. This knowledge was then transferred to his children and the future of artists in his community. His children have learned to paint the djang with their own interpretations and creativity. Kubarkku states that Dick Nadjalorro, Paul Nabulumo Namarinjmak, Marina Murdilnga, Ken Ngindjalakku Djungkudj and Kennedy Yiddunu are all proficient artists now, and represent the future of art production in Western Arnhem Land.

== Passing on his knowledge ==
Kubarkku taught his son, Dick Nadjolorro, about the art of painting. Nadjolorro's own artistic style honors his lineage and draws upon the rarrk techniques favored by Kubarkku, who was both his father and his mentor, but his work also incorporates figurative elements in his depictions of ancestral beings such as Ngalyod and Yawkyawk. These two female transformational beings are incredibly prominent in Kuninjku art, and their stories are linked. Yawkyawk is the young girl, mermaid spirit, and Ngalyod is the Rainbow Serpent, a powerful ancestral creator being. Kubarkku and his sons were the guardians of the Yawkyawk associated with the djang sites in the estates of the Kulmaru clans. As a result, their works were inspired by their inherited relationships to these locations and the ancestral narratives tied to a living landscape. Kubarkku also passed down his knowledge about ritual matters to Nadjolorro.

== Important works ==
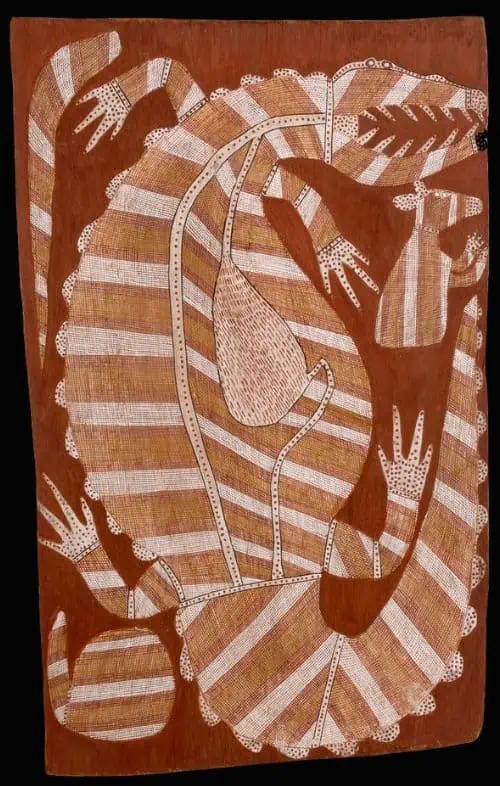
Namanjwarre the Crocodile

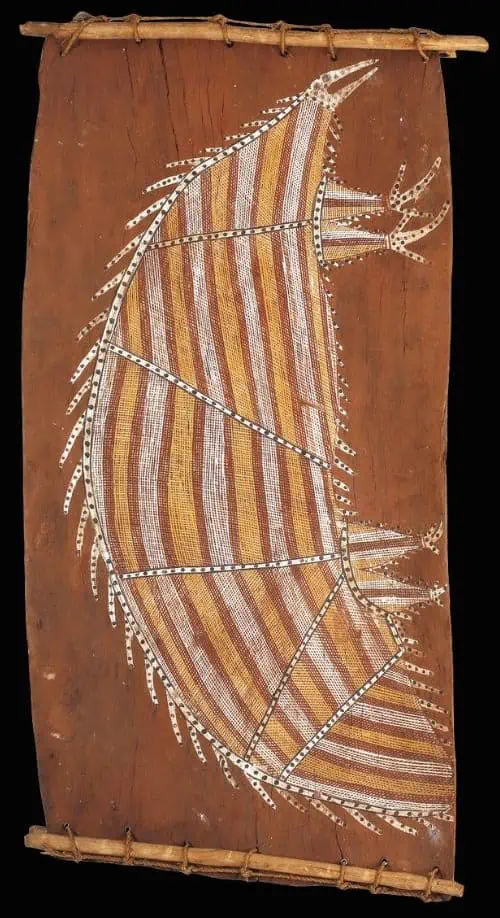
Ngarrbek, the Echidna

=== Namanjwarre the Crocodile ===
This bark painting by Kubarkku depicts a crocodile totem, Namanjwarre, an important Yiridja moiety totem. Namanjwarre is a saltwater creature that is known as the protector of the sacred objects of the Mardayin ceremony. In legend, Namanjwarre would devour any man who diverged from the protocol of the ceremony. These types of crocodiles are very common in the upper areas of Liverpool River and Maragalidban Creek. Specifically, in Kurrindin, an outstation near the Liverpool River district, there is a sacred site that aims to protect these creatures.

Kubarkku painted Namanjwarre in a way that emulates the style of infill that is painted onto the sacred objects of the Mardayin ceremony. This aspect illustrates the interconnection between Namanjwarre and the Mardayin ceremony and highlights how Kubarkku emphasizes his culture in his work.

=== Ngarrbek, the Echidna ===
Another bark painting by Kubarkku depicts an echidna named Ngarrbek. This species has sacred ties to the Yabbadurruwa ceremony. This

ceremony is performed in Kuninjku where Kubarkku himself lives. This is one of the two sacred ceremonies that the Kuninjku people practice, the other being the Kunabibbi ceremony. While they are two separate ceremonies, they work as a pair, playing off of each other in a complementary fashion to showcase themes of ancestral creation and the cycles of the season. Ngarrbek is important to this ceremony because according to legend, he fought with another spirit, Ngalmangiyi after he ate his child. Ngalmangiyi's weapon of choice was several spears that he threw into Ngarrbek, creating the spines in Echidnas.

=== The Rainbow Serpent ===
In this bark painting, Kubarkku depicts one of the most important spirits to the Western Arnhem Land Culture, the Rainbow Serpent, Nygalod. He is believed by the Aboriginal people to have created various sacred sites in Australia. The serpent, however, can both create and destroy, hence the power he holds with the people. The name Rainbow serpent comes from Nygalod's ties to rain and the wet, monsoon seasons of Australia that create rainbows in the sky. His powers are most prevalent during this season. He rests in freshwater springs during his off-season, the dry season, where he fosters the growth of various water plants that live there. His power is extremely feared, as he will swallow people who offend him, and create floods that can kill many people, yet also create them a new. The sacred sites associated with Nygalod are extremely respected and are often off-limits for many activities.

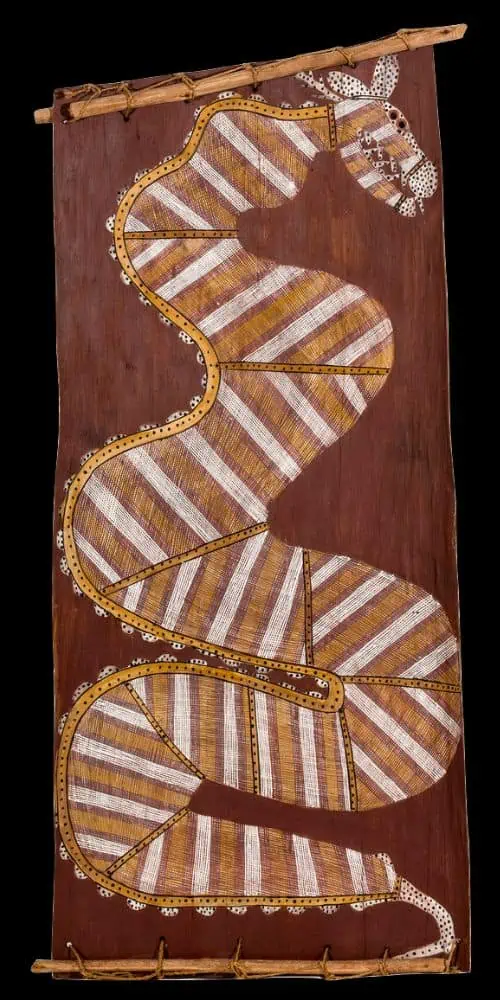
The Rainbow Serpent

=== Ngalyod Consuming Two Spirit Brothers (1980) ===
Natural pigments on bark (60 x 148 cm) Collection Museum and Art Gallery of the Northern Territory

This is a bark painting created by Mick Kubarkku that tells a strong narrative. There are prominent figures depicted in the image. Two human figures representing brothers are shown entwined and are being swallowed by Ngalyod, the Rainbow Serpent. This event is known to have taken place at the sacred site of Molerrhlerrh, which is located on the Mann river near Yikarrakkal. The story does not end with the two brothers being swallowed. In this narrative, the rainbow serpent is now "pregnant" with the two brothers. After the attack, she submerged herself into the water at Molerrhlerrh and transformed into a mermaid spirit called Ngalkunburriyaymi. There are various connections between this story and other events that are known to have occurred. For example, a similar incident also happened to occur at a location called Malworn, which is a Djalam clan country west of Marrkolidjban.

=== Wardbukkarrawardbukkarra Spirits (1979) ===
This painting by Kubarkku, created using natural pigments on bark, was featured in the Collection Djómi Museum in Maningrida. The work depicts malevolent Mimih spirits known as Wardbukkarrawardbukkarra. These spirits are known for killing humans and eating their cheeks. One of these spirits once kidnapped a Cuckoo Shrike Man named Wirriwirriyak, but Wirriwirriyak was able to escape his captor when he was not being watched. Upon Wirriwirriyak's return to camp, his father sought justice for his son by tracking down the Wardbukkarrawardbukkarra and striking the spirits' rock shelter with a bolt of lightning, crushing them to death.

=== Dird Djang (Moon Dreamings) (c. 1994) ===
Dird Djang (Moon Dreamings) (c. 1994) is another important painting by Mick Kubarrku, and is a bark painting done towards the end of his career. It depicts the full moon and the new moon, respectively Bukkulurl and Lirrk. This piece reflects a celestial theme Kubarrku brought into his work heavily in his paintings in the 1990s. This painting is named after the site Dird Djang, where there is a large round hole on a sandstone outcrop. Kubarrku thought this was reminiscent of the moon and took inspiration from it for this painting. The site of Dird Djang is located near the outstation of Yirrkarrakkal, which Mick Kubarrku established in the 1980s. In Kubarrku's culture and in the context of his ancestral knowledge, the moon is a symbol for both mortality and rebirth. This is shown in the constant waxing and waning of the moon. The piece reflects much of Kubarrku's style, sticking to a figurative structure which dominated the space of the bark and as always using natural pigments from the earth to paint on the bark.

== Kubarkku's works at the National Gallery of Australia ==
Mick Kubarkku did not make any paintings or other art works after the early 2000s, and Kubarkku created only a few works past 1995. In 1995, there was an exhibition featuring Mick Kubarrku and Lofty Bardayal Nadjamerrek. This exhibition was curated by Curator of Aboriginal Art and Material Culture Maggie West at the Museum and Art Gallery of the Northern Territory, and featured many bark paintings and several of Kubarkku's have been acquired by the National Gallery of Australia. The National Gallery of Australia now holds bark paintings by Mick Kubarrku which he has done over four decades of his career, and with the more recent 2008 acquisition of Namorodo Spirit (1971), Dird Djang (Moon Dreaming) (c. 1990), and Njaljod-Rainbow snakes at Gubumi on the Mann (1979), they now hold 25 of his works. The works they hold reflect Kubarkku's traditional approach to painting, a result of his intense immersion in his culture as he grew up with minimal contact with other cultures. These three most recent acquisitions show the influence of rock art, and are examples of his focus on figurative artwork.

== List of works ==
Kubarkku was a prolific artist who produced a number of works over the course of his multi-decade career. These works include:

- Dird Djang, Moon Dreaming with Sun (1994), natural pigments on bark
- Ngalyod Consuming Two Spirit Brothers (1980), natural pigments on bark
- Namarrkon the Lightning Spirit (1994), natural pigments on paper
- Crocodile Hunting Story (1979), natural pigments on bark
- Dird Djang, Moon Dreaming (1991), natural pigments on bark
- Waterholes (1980), natural pigments on bark
- Wardbukkarrawardbukkarra Spirits (1979), natural pigments on bark
- Ngalyod the Rainbow Serpent (1980), natural pigments on bark
- Dird Djang, Moon Dreaming (1990), natural pigments on bark
- Mimih Spirit (1992), natural pigments on wood
- Yawkyawk Spirit (1995), natural pigments on wood
- Yawkyawk Spirit (1986), natural pigments on wood
- Mimih Spirit (1992), natural pigments on wood
- Mimih Spirit (1992), natural pigments on wood
- Namarrkon the Lightning Spirit (1994), natural pigments on bark
- Marlindji, the Preying Mantis Spirit (1980), natural pigments on bark
- Moon Dreaming with Sun and Stars (1990), natural pigments on bark
- Dird Djang, Moon Dreaming with Sun (1994), natural pigments on bark
- Ngalyod the Rainbow Serpent (1993), ochres on bark
- Wayarra Spirit (1973), natural pigments on bark
- Hollow-Log Bone-Pole with Ancestral Saltwater Crocodile Design (1988), natural pigments on wood
- Kumoken the Freshwater Crocodile (1980), natural pigments on bark
- Emu Painting (1980), natural pigments on bark
- Namanjwarre Saltwater Crocodiles (1970), natural pigments on bark
- Catfish Painting (1980), natural pigments on bark
- Mimih Spirits (1980), natural pigments on bark
- Nakkorro the Freshwater Shark (1994), natural pigments on bark

== Collections ==
- Artbank, Sydney
- Art Gallery of South Australia, Adelaide
- Art Gallery of Western Australia, Perth
- Australian Museum, Sydney
- Department of Archaeology and Anthropology, Australian National University, Canberra
- Djomi Museum, Maningrida
- Kluge-Ruhe Aboriginal Art Collection of the University of Virginia
- Museum and Art Gallery of the Northern Territory, Darwin
- Museum of Contemporary Art, Arnotts Collection, Sydney
- National Gallery of Australia
- National Gallery of Victoria, Melbourne
- National Maritime Museum, Darling Harbour, Sydney
- National Museum of Australia, Canberra
- South Australian Museum, Adelaide
- The Holmes a Court Collection, Perth
- University of Wollongong Collection

== Significant exhibitions ==
- 1996 Hogarth Galleries, Sydney NSW
- 1982, Aboriginal Art at the Top, Museum and Art Gallery of the Northern Territory, Darwin
- 1983, Artists of Arnhem Land, Canberra School of Arts
- 1987, A selection of Aboriginal Art owned by the ANU, Drill Hall Gallery, ACT
- 1988, Dreamings, the art of Aboriginal Australia, The Asia Society Galleries, New York.
- 1988, The Fifth National Aboriginal Art Award Exhibition, Museum and Art Gallery of the Northern Territory, Darwin
- 1988, Aboriginal art of the Top End, c.1935-Early 1970s, National Gallery of Victoria, Melbourne
- 1989, A selection of Aboriginal Art owned by the ANU, Drill Hall Gallery, ACT
- 1989, A Myriad of Dreaming: Twentieth Century Aboriginal Art, Westpac Gallery, Melbourne; Design Warehouse Sydney
- 1990, Spirit in Land, Bark Paintings from Arnhem Land, National Gallery of Victoria
- 1993, The Tenth National Aboriginal Art Award Exhibition, Museum and Art Gallery of the Northern Territory, Darwin
- 1993/4, ARATJARA, Art of the First Australians, Touring: Kunstammlung Nordrhein-Westfalen, Düsseldorf; Hayward Gallery, London; Louisiana Museum, Humlebaek, Denmark
- 1994, Power of the Land, Masterpieces of Aboriginal Art, National Gallery of Victoria.
- 1995, Rainbow, Sugarbag and Moon - The Art of Mick Kubarkku and Bardayal Nadjamerrek, Museum and Art Gallery of the Northern Territory, Darwin, and touring.
- 1995, Willy Jolpa and Mick Kubarkku, Group exhibition at Aboriginal and South Pacific Gallery, Sydney.
- 1995, The Twelfth National Aboriginal Art Award, Museum and Art Gallery of the Northern Territory, Darwin
