= Yirawala =

Aboriginal Australian artist

Yirawala MBE
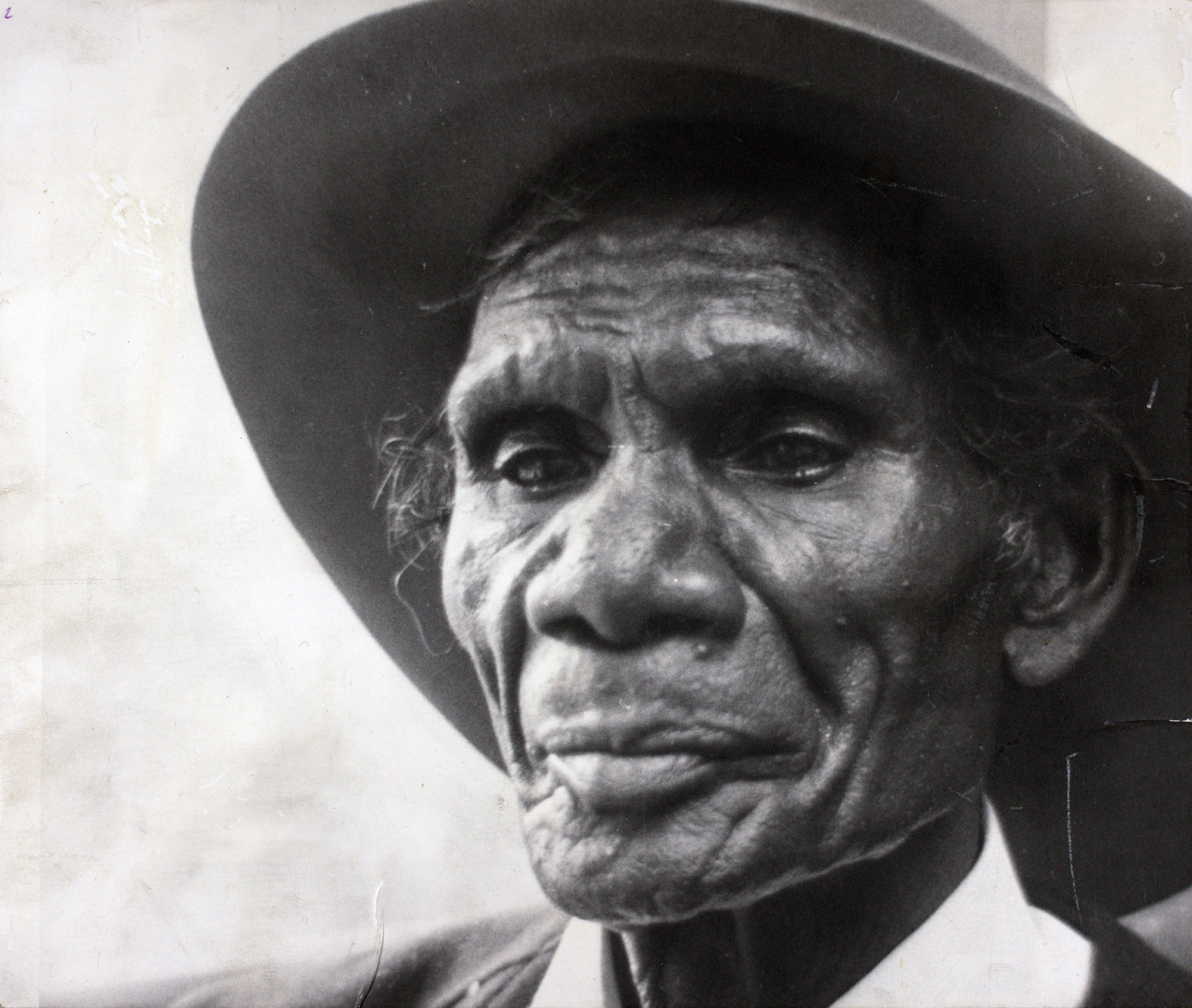
- Born: c. 1897; Marugulidban, Northern Territory, Australia
- Died: 17 April 1976; Croker Island, Northern Territory, Australia
- Resting place: Minjilang Cemetery, Croker Island, Northern Territory, Australia
- Other names: Billy, Yirrawala, Yirrwala

Yirawala (c. 1897 – 17 April 1976) was an Aboriginal Australian leader, labourer and bark painter, most known for his artistic works. He was born in the Northern Territory, which at the time was responsibility of the state of South Australia, and died in Minjilang, otherwise known as Croker Island. (Note: Yirawala's exact birth date is contentious. Other references state that he lived from c. 1890 to Good Friday 1976.) (Note: Other sources state that, although the date of his birth is not known, in 1970 he gave his age as 73.) He was extremely influential in promoting the acceptance of Aboriginal works as fine art, instead of "ethnographic material."^{[14]} He was intensely concerned with the preservation of his culture, and he played an important role as an educator and mentor for young Aboriginal artists. His works can now be found in galleries across the world, and his influence lives on through the artists he inspired and the innovations he introduced to the artistic community. When Harold Thomas, the creator of the Aboriginal Flag was asked “Who do you think were our greatest artists?”, he responded: "I would have no hesitation to say Yirawala and Mandarkk. If I were to compare the two with any others I would say Yirawala is our Picasso, Mandarkk our Braque."

== Early life ==
Yirawala was born into the Naborn clan of the Kunwinjku language, and he was raised in the Marrkolidjban region, inland from Maningrida, an Indigenous community in Western Arnhem Land. He was born of the Dhuwa moiety. Though little is known of Yirawala's early life, he was fathered by Nowaritj, a significant religious leader who retained knowledge of his people's symbols and cave galleries rock paintings. He spent most of his life on Croker Island and retained strong family and cultural ties. His artistic ability became apparent at an early age. He grew up surrounded by the rich culture as he learned his father's designs, songs, stories, and rock art. Spiritual and cultural knowledge is passed down by elders in the community and is integral to the Aboriginal people, therefore, Yirawala spent much of his early life learning. He underwent many levels of initiation that he finally conquered at the age of 45. By this time he had received the final secrets that enabled him to become a great ritual leader, with knowledge over all the secular and sacred ceremonial content of the culture.

== Art career ==
Yirawala was commonly known as "Picasso of Arnhem Land". Picasso was an admirer of Yirawala's work and apparently said "When one observes his dynamic use of positive and negative space one understands why this is so." Although commonly quoted, there is no confirmed documentation that Pablo Picasso personally viewed Yirawala’s work or made direct statements about it. The comparison between Yirawala and Picasso is often symbolic, highlighting Yirawala’s modernist influence and importance in Aboriginal art history.

Through this encounter, Yirawala demonstrated the power of indigenous artists to impact non-indigenous audiences. After seeing Yirawala's intricately manufactured aesthetic of bark paintings, Picasso declared "This is what I have been trying to achieve all my life". Yirawala was a key figure in the history of Australian art and the 1970s contemporary Indigenous art movement in Papunya.

Yirawala was an active painter from the 1960s until his death. He has produced many works using natural ochres on eucalyptus bark, a medium that is traditional of Northern Arnhem Land. He began painting on barks at the Methodist mission on Croker Island. Croker Island at this time was a melting pot of clans, and he joined a group of artists who were able to paint with a greater degree of artistic freedom. His paintings related to ritual as they portrayed creation ancestors, totemic plants and animals, and incidents drawn from epic narratives that are re-enacted during ceremony.

His art style is characteristic of those present on the rock-art galleries he grew up around. He incorporated "many back-to-back figures in his bark painting compositions."

Several of his works feature dynamic figures, and utilize x-ray imagery to elevate his pieces. X-ray art is a style typically found in rock art, in which the internal organs and backbone of the creatures are highlighted. The animals painted in this style are usually those that are hunted for food. He garnered a lot of guidance and inspiration from these rock-art styles, as well as ceremonial knowledge, which he transformed into bark paintings. He is widely acknowledged as one of the most important artists of his generation. The Museum of Contemporary Australia highlights his impact in the following: "With his depth of knowledge and artistic virtuosity, senior Western Arnhem Land artist Yirawala transformed the surfaces of rock-art galleries, the skin of Kuninjku people and sheets of bark into cultural icons".^{[15]}

His work was also featured in the Yerbury/Macquarie art collections. Two important works were featured. The first was titled Kangaroo Increase Ritual, circa 1970. In this painting, male dancers perform the Dreaming story about the death of Kundaagi, the red plains kangaroo who was killed and eaten by the Mimi people. The old kangaroo mother made the first Lorrgon ceremony for her son, and sanctions the ceremony today when a man dies, to release the new ghost to travel back to its home country where it will dwell with other spirits. The other bark featured was titled Maraian Ceremony, which was also circa 1970. This painting depicts the Ancestral Beings with the new ghost after the ceremony. He was also innovator as the first Kununjku artist to use white pigment as a background for his paintings. This shimmering quality of the white pigment is enhanced by the use of dotting and rarrk. Yirawala was one of the earliest Kuninjku artists to consistently use white pigment as a full background in bark painting, a technique that had ceremonial roots but was innovatively adapted for aesthetic impact. This shimmer effect, especially when overlaid with rarrk, became a visual hallmark of his work and inspired future generations.

Yirawala, due to his authority as a cultural leader, demonstrated his authority by revolutionizing the art of Arnhem land. His work is distinguished from other styles as he incorporates Mardayin, Lorrkon, and Wubarr traditional body designs, which incorporate rarrk. Yirawala pioneered the introduction of Mardayin designs—sacred ceremonial imagery—into the commercial art world by modifying them for public audiences. While these works initially failed to attract buyers in the 1970s, they later became central to the success of artists like John Mawurndjul in the 1990s.

Rarrk is a style that is derived from traditional ritual practices and features geometric cross-hatching. It is symbolic of ancestral power. When he began to produce these rarrk designs for the market, he was required to omit some elements that were not suitable for outsider knowledge. This consequently inspired other artists to create works with ceremonial meaning, without being too explicit. Mardayin paintings in particular were first developed by Yirawala, however, the market of his time did not respond well to such works. He also made his art more available: "Yirawala produced 'outside' versions of these designs for the market. They were modified to suit the different audience." In paintings like Maralatj c. 1976, Yirawala's use of cross-hatching patterns is particularly apparent. The painting portrays the earth mother with rarrk designs on the mother figure and above her head, symbolizing the connection between artistry and Mardayin designs.

The market officially welcomed these Mardayin designs in the 1990s, especially works done by Yirawala's protege, John Mawurndjul. Now that rarrk has become popularized in the art sphere, Kuninjku people use it as a measure of good and bad paintings. "Rarrk-mak" is used to describe "good rarrk," which usually consists of careful, unhurried cross-hatching. "Rarrk-warre" is used to describe "rubbish rarrk," which is less successful. The Mother of Kundakidj is one of Yirawala’s most renowned bark paintings that illustrates the relationship the Kununijku people have with ancestral beings called Djang. The kangaroo is a key figure shown throughout traditional rock paintings in Western Arnhem Land, and presence in contemporary bark paintings facilitated cross cultural exchange between binnih and yolngu people. Yirawala painted this figure — traditionally found rock art — as a form of political activism against uranium mining in the rock country. The political dimension of Yirawala’s art became especially apparent in the 1970s, as he used traditional motifs to protest against uranium mining in sacred land. By blending ancestral symbols with environmental themes, his works such as The Mother of Kundakidji articulated Indigenous sovereignty and land rights through a visual medium.

The artist spoke out against the destruction of traditional sites: ‘He said mining helicopters, like blowflies, were sniffing the land.’ The Mother of Kundakidji gains its polictal significance from its ceremonial meaning. Furthermore, Mardayin kangaross and mimih also used cross-hatching and traditional designs to depict ceremononial significance. Anthropologist Luke Taylor expressed how Yirawala's painting such as the Mating dance of the wallabies signify a dance performed in the Wubarr ceremony. In the Wubarr Ceremony, actors perform dances based on the mating behaviors of kangaroos to illustrate the power ancestral beings have in rejuvenating the earth. The themes of rejuvenation in ceremonial practices are extrapolated to political activism to symbolize the resilience of the Yolngu people.

Yirawala’s role in the art world was largely influenced by his associate and art dealer Sandra Le Brun Holmes in the 1960-70’s, and facilitated the sale of 139 bark paintings to the Australian National Gallery in 1976. She also assisted Yirawala on a travel exhibition of his park painting to Adelliad, Melbourne, Sydney, Orange, and Port Moresby in 1971, the same year he was awarded his MBE. 1964 Yirawala met Sandra Le Brun Holmes, who became his patron. Holmes was a Darwin resident who aided the Aboriginal people with the preservation of their culture. She accompanied Yirawala and his family on their visit to Marugulidban, a historical rock face covered in art. Yirawala brought his sons their to teach them tradition. He was on a cultural mission “Yirawala wished to show the ancestral cave paintings to his sons and explain their meaning—‘so we don’t lose the old law’.”

"So that they could learn from the art, highlighting arts role in cultural preservation and education. Sandra, and her husband Cecil, documented this journey producing a tape called the "Return to the Dreaming." This was not the end of their relationship. She continued to work with Yirawala, helping organize his first solo exhibition in 1971 at the University of Sydney.[1] This exhibition, highlighting his bark paintings, has since traveled across Australia, being displayed in Adelaide, Melbourne, Orange and Port Morseby.[4] Sandra even aided in telling the story of Yirawala once he grew too blind to continue painting. In her book, Yirawala (Artist and Man), she writes about how he continues to aid in furthering Aboriginal culture, including illustrations and photos of the artist himself.[27]

Art dealers went against Yirawala's wishes of presenting and selling his paintings in story cycles, and most of the profit for his artwork went directly to the art dealers. His artwork was sold both within Australia and overseas. This caused Yirawala to become disillusioned with the art industry and he never knew the outcome of many of his famous and sacred artworks. Yirawala strongly opposed the commercialization of his work. However, since his death some of his works have sold for over sixty-thousand dollars at auction. Through his artwork, Yirawala was a part of a movement among the Aboriginal people to acquire self-determination and independence. His work helped modify Western perspectives of "contemporary" art while also helping bring Aboriginal art to the Western art landscape.

Yirawala often told witty stories and had a great sense of humor which prevented him becoming completely disillusioned with the commercial art industry. He is often fondly remembered as having a handsome and dignified face with piercing eyes, shielded by an old bush hat.

== School of Yirawala ==
Marrkolidjban outstation in the Liverpool River region played an important role in the development of Aboriginal art. This station served as an open art studio and communal center. The open nature of this space promoted collaboration. Yirawala worked closely with Curly Bardkadubba in the 1970s, showing him the intricacies of bark painting. He also served as a mentor for young prominent artists like Peter Marralwanga and John Mawurndjul. Specifically, Yirawala encouraged other artists to use Rarrk in their works, a specific type of cross-hatching with ancestral and ceremonial ties. When Yirawala returned to Croker Island, he introduced this cross-hatching to its artists, including Midjau Midjau and Samual Wagbara. Yirawala’s mentorship extended across generations, shaping key figures such as John Mawurndjul, Peter Marralwanga, and Curly Bardkadubba. He not only taught technique but also emphasized the importance of encoding cultural authority in visual form, encouraging experimentation with hybrid ancestral beings and full bark coverage.

However, his influence extends far beyond the popularization of the use of rarrk. He advocated for artists to fill the entire bark with their work, before which it was common to leave a significant amount of negative space in ones work. He also influenced students like Peter Marralwanga to push the boundaries of artistry, as Peter introduced traditional beings such as hybrid animals into his work. The blend of one animal — such as the head of a kangaroo or body of a serpent — with another is emblematic of the combination of not only social and religious themes, but contemporary and traditional artistry.

He was a well traveled man, and possessed regional knowledge from a number of different clans. In his works he depicted Luma Luma, the giant ogre, The Rainbow Serpent, and many Mimih. The cultural authority he built up over the years enabled him to paint said figures—these sacred designs could only be painted by certain individuals. He used this knowledge to combine styles, creating unique works that others could not produce. His painting of Luma Luma was especially notable because Yirawala depicted him as he died. His work features the ancestor's internal organs as they turn into sacred objects, and his bones are seen dividing into the two moieties, Dhuwa and Yirritja.

== Later life ==
Yirawala was married three times and had seven children. For a time, he lived in Oenpelli(Gunbalanya) with his first wife, with whom he had three children. His first wife later died in childbirth and left him a widower. He then married Mary Malilba with whom he had one daughter and two sons. He later married Margaret Monanggu with whom he had a son. Little is known about them aside from two sons, Bobby and Danny, who lived on Croker Island. He settled with his family on Croker Island in the late 1950s, by which time he was already established as an influential and respected bark painter.

Yirawala was a ceremonial leader, a law-carrier and a medicine man and healer. Yirawala was perceived as a man of integrity and wisdom. He dedicated himself to the preservation of his people's culture. Lazarus Lamilami described him as one of a great line of ceremonial leaders who inherited sacred designs to be passed on to future generations. As elders within the community are tasked with passing down cultural knowledge, by the 1950s, Yirawala became a teacher to both his own community and outsiders. Yirawala was also a strong advocate for land rights. In June 1973, he represented his people at the Aboriginal Land Rights Hearings at Maningrida.

Yirawala was made a Member of the Order of the British Empire (MBE) in 1971 and received the International Art Cooperation Award. Following the awarding of his MBE, Adelaide sculptor John Dowie was commissioned to create a bronze bust of Yirawala. Yirawala believed that this sculpture held his spirit.

Yirawala died on 17 April 1976 on Croker Island, where he is buried in Minjilang cemetery. After his death, the possession of the bronze sculpture became controversial. At the time, the sculpture was held by the Adelaide Art Gallery, however, after some dispute, it was given to Yirawala's family.

The National Gallery of Australia was the first public institution to recognize his significance as an Australian artist, as they acquired 139 of his paintings in 1976. The Gallery received the 139 bark paintings by Yirawala as a donation rather than a purchase.

In later years, these works were collected by the Karel Kupka Collection of Arnhem Land art. These pieces were grouped with other rare paintings, specifically depicting sorcery and magic, including works by Yirawala's contemporary, Paddy Compass Namatbara. The collection that was put together and preserved by Yirawala's patron Sandra Holmes, it was said to have dealt with "a multitude of themes and subjects to which Yirawala had access to due to his elevated ritual standing".

He and Paddy Compass, in particular, died prior to the advent of an arts industry, yet their works are now amongst the most collectable of all the Aboriginal bark paintings. In 1982, one of Yirawala's paintings was used on the 27¢ stamp, which commemorated the 15th anniversary of the National Gallery. At the time, it was the largest collection by an Aboriginal artist to be featured in a public institution. His works are hosted in many Australian state galleries and international collections. He has been the subject of two films that Holmes made: Return to the Dreaming (1968) and The Picasso of Arnhem Land (1982). Images of Yirawala's bark paintings from the National Museum of Australia's collection can be found online.

== Significant exhibitions ==
- 1971 Yirawala, University of Sydney
- 1988 Dreamings: The Art of Aboriginal Australia, Asia Society, New York
- 1993 Aratjara: Art of the First Australians, Kunstsammlung Nordrhein-Westfalen, Dusseldorf (1993), touring Europe (1993–1994)
- 1993-1994 MCA Aboriginal Art: The Arnott's Collection, Museum of Contemporary Art Australia, Sydney
- 2004 Crossing Country: The Alchemy of Western Arnhem Land Art, Art Gallery of New South Wales, Sydney
- 2007 One sun, one moon, Art Gallery of New South Wales, Sydney
- 2008 They Are Meditating: Bark Paintings from the MCA's Arnott's Collection, Museum of Contemporary Art Australia, Sydney
- 2010 Aboriginal and Torres Strait Islander Art: Collection Highlights, National Gallery of Australia, Canberra
- 2011 Tell me Tell me: Australian and Korean Contemporary Art 1976–2011, Museum of Contemporary Art Australia, Sydney and National Museum of Modern and Contemporary Art, Seoul
- 2014 Old Masters: Australia's Great Bark Artists, National Museum of Australia, Canberra
