= Jimmy Njiminjuma =

Australian painter

Jimmy Njiminjuma (1947–2004) was a painter known for being one of the most renowned artists from the western Arnhem Land region.

== Biography ==
Jimmy Nijiminjuma was born in Mumeka, Western Arnhem Land, Northern Territory of Australia in 1947. For the beginning of his life he lived with his father Anchor Kulunba, at Mumeka outstation. Njiminjuma recounted that his father and uncle, Peter Marralwanga, were his early mentors in painting. During the 1980s, he assumed a significant role in guiding his younger brother, John Mawurndjul, in the art of bark painting. Subsequently, Njiminjuma established an outstation at Kurrurldul on Mimarlar Creek, situated south of Maningrida along the Tomkinson River. Proficient across various subjects, Njiminjuma frequently depicted yawkyawk figures, believed to be female water spirits in Kuninjku culture. These spirits are often portrayed with fish-like forked tails and flowing hair reminiscent of waterweed. In his work "Yawkyawk" (2000), Njiminjuma depicted these spirits within the sacred landscape of Milmingkan, his clan's ancestral territory. The rarrk designs to the left of the painting symbolize the waterhole's banks, with the fork-tailed figure set against a backdrop of rarrk, representing the sacred site. Njiminjuma's artistic ingenuity is evident in his ability to intricately merge complex figures with geometric background designs, drawing inspiration from the body paintings of the Mardayin ceremony. These designs not only adorn participants but also reflect Kuninjku beliefs about the creative actions of ancestral beings shaping landscape forms. According to Kuninjku tradition, these ancestral beings continue to reside within the earth at these significant sites, serving as a vital life force.

== Career ==
Njiminjuma's career began under the guidance of his father and uncle, Peter Marralwanga, who introduced him to the art of bark painting. As he honed his skills, Njiminjuma emerged as a leading artist within his community, known for his mastery of intricate designs and rich symbolism. One of the hallmarks of Njiminjuma's career was his ability to merge traditional Kuninjku motifs with contemporary artistic techniques. His paintings often depicted ancestral beings, sacred landscapes, and mythological figures, reflecting the deep spiritual connection he had with his cultural heritage. Throughout the 1980s and beyond, Njiminjuma played a pivotal role in mentoring younger artists, including his brother, John Mawurndjul, and sharing his knowledge of traditional painting techniques. This commitment to passing down artistic traditions ensured the preservation and continuation of Kuninjku art for future generations. Njiminjuma's career also saw him establish an outstation at Kurrurldul on Mimarlar Creek, providing a space for artistic expression and cultural revitalization within his community. This initiative underscored his dedication to not only his own artistic practice but also to the broader preservation of Indigenous culture. His artworks, characterized by intricate patterns, vibrant colors, and deep cultural significance, garnered widespread acclaim both nationally and internationally. Njiminjuma's contributions to the world of Indigenous art continue to be celebrated for their beauty, cultural significance, and enduring impact on the artistic landscape of Australia.

== Works ==
- Ngalyod (The Rainbow Serpent), purchased 1989, natural pigments on bark, 148.5 x 55 cm
- Wakwak (Crow Dreaming Site), 2000, natural pigments on bark, 105.5 x 61.0 cm
- Yawkyawk (Young girl's spirit), 1985, natural pigments on bark, 40.5 x 21.9 cm
