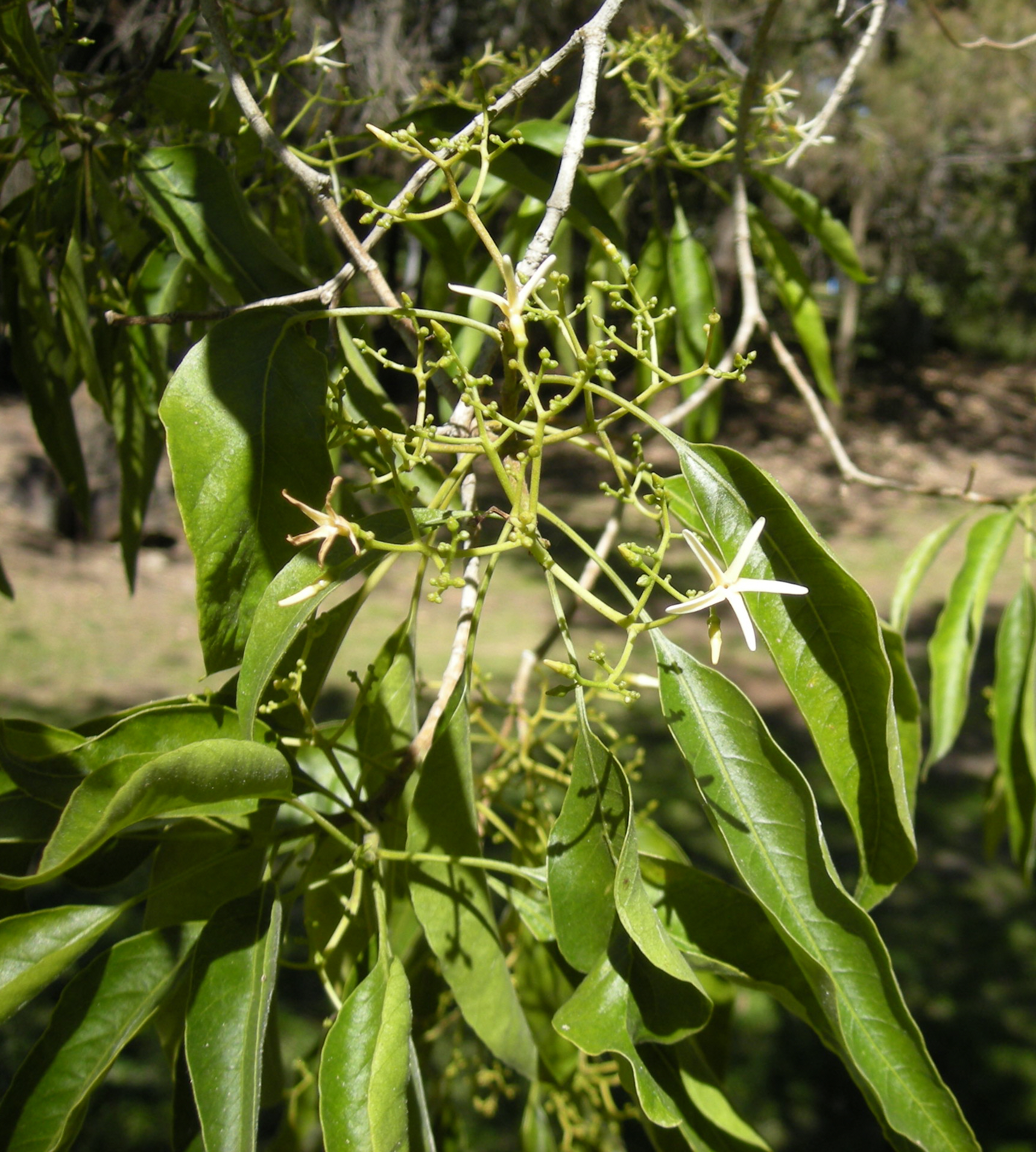
- Foliage and flowers

Conservation status
- Least Concern (IUCN 3.1)

Scientific classification
- Kingdom: Plantae
- Clade: Tracheophytes
- Clade: Angiosperms
- Clade: Eudicots
- Clade: Asterids
- Order: Gentianales
- Family: Apocynaceae
- Genus: Alstonia
- Species: A. constricta

Binomial name
- Alstonia constricta F.Muell.

Synonyms
- Alstonia constricta var. mollis F.M.Bailey; Alstonia constricta var. montmariensis F.M.Bailey; Alstonia mollis Benth.

= Alstonia constricta =

Species of tree

Alstonia constricta, commonly known as quinine bush or bitterbark, is an Australian endemic shrub or small tree species of the family Apocynaceae.

== Description ==
Alstonia constricta has an erect growth form, reaching to 12 m in height. The species is capable of producing adventitious shoots or 'suckers' from the root system and in this manner often forms thickets. Leaves are pubescent, narrow and lanceolate, from 5–20 cm (2.0–7.9 in) in length. Flowers are white to cream, 2–4 cm (0.79–1.57 in) across. The bark has a corky texture, and develops a grooved appearance in older plants. A. constricta produces a white latex, and contains several alkaloids, several of which have medicinal potential, including reserpine.

== Distribution and habitat ==
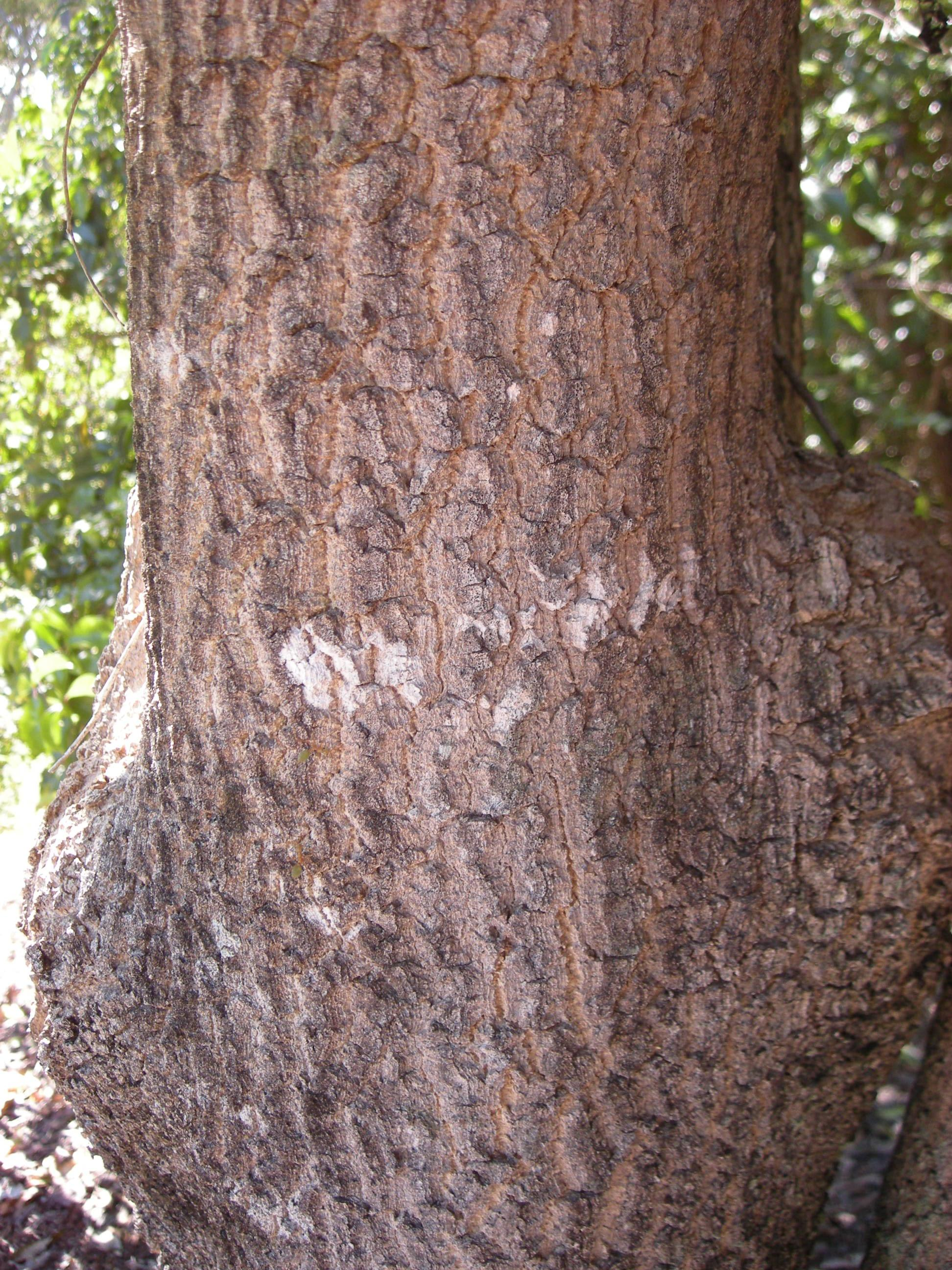
Alstonia constricta bark.

Alstonia constricta is the only subtropical member of the genus, and occurs in Eastern Australia from the Tropic of Capricorn in Queensland and then southward to northern New South Wales. The species occurs in eucalypt and Acacia woodlands, vine scrubs and gallery forests from humid coastal regions through to the semiarid and arid inland. The field botanist Anders Bofeldt discovered an isolated population in the Shoalhaven River Gorge in southern New South Wales.

== Historical uses ==
Joseph Maiden, in his 1889 book The Useful Native Plants of Australia, recorded that its "yellowish-brown, often thick and deeply fissured bark, is intensely bitter, and possesses valuable febrifugal and tonic properties. It is regularly quoted in London drug lists. A decoction is sometimes sold in the colonies as 'bitters'. Mr. Christy states that it is used by some English brewers of pale ale for export, as it produces neither headaches nor other ill effects of hops. It tastes remarkably like Cinchona bark, and seems to partake somewhat of the properties of both quinine and nux vomica. This drug is undoubtedly worthy of careful experiments by medical men. (See A. scholaris.) The bark contains, according to Palm (who examined it in 1863), a neutral resinous bitter principle, called by him alsfonin, similar to cailcedrin and tulucumin, a volatile oil, smelling like camphor, an iron-greening tannin, gum, resin, fat, wax, protein substance, oxalic acid, and citric acid. Mueller and Rummel, in Wittstein's Organic Constituents of Plants, give the following account of the alkaloid : Alstonin, the alkaloid of the bark of Alstonia constricta, F.v.M., is obtained by treating the alcoholic extract with water and a little hydrochloric acid, adding to the filtered solution a small excess of ammonia, dissolving the separated flocculent precipitate in ether, evaporating the ethereal solution, and purifying the remaining alkaloid (alsfonin) by dissolving again in dilute acid and repeating the above process. It forms an orange yellow, brittle, pellucid mass, of very bitter taste, melts below 100 degrees Celsius and is carbonised at higher temperatures; dissolves easily in alcohol, ether, and dilute acids, but sparingly in water. All its solutions in the dilute state exhibit a strong blue fluorescence which is not affected by acids or alkalies. Its alcoholic solution has a slightly alkaline reaction. Alsfonin combines with acids, but does not completely neutralise them. Hydrochloric and other strong acids, also alkalies, decompose it partly on evaporation in the water-bath to a dark-coloured acid substance. The hydrochloride of alstonine gives precipitates with the chlorides of platinum and mercury, iodide of potassium, the phosphomolybdate and metatungstate of soda, bichromate of potash, picric acid, and with the alkalies and alkaline carbonates. Tannic acid does not precipitate the hydrochloride, but does the acetate and the pure base. Concentrated nitric acid dissolves alsfonin with crimson colour, yellow on warming; sulphuric acid reddish-brown, afterwards dirty green; hydrochloric acid only...".

According to Maud Grieve's 1931 work, A Modern Herbal, powdered bark of Alstonia constricta was used to relieve chronic diarrhoea, dysentery, fevers, and as an anthelmintic. She also reported that although there was no evidence to show why it should be, herbalists prefer using it to quinine, and it was also used by homoeopaths.

Bitterbark has been used to treat colds, and was used after World War II to treat returning soldiers who had contracted malaria.

== Research ==
As of 2022 research into various types of bush medicine is being carried out by Central Queensland University in consultation with Ghungalu elder Uncle Steve Kemp. The study will include examination of the methods used to extract and process plants, such as bitterbark and gumby gumby.
