= Paratungstate =

In chemistry, paratungstate refers to the anion with the formula [W_{12}O_{42}]^{12−} and salts derived from this anion. The term also refers to protonated derivatives of this anion, including [H_{2}W_{12}O_{42}]^{10−}. Ammonium paratungstate (or APT), (NH_{4})_{10}[H_{2}W_{12}O_{42}] is a key intermediate in the purification of tungsten from its ores.

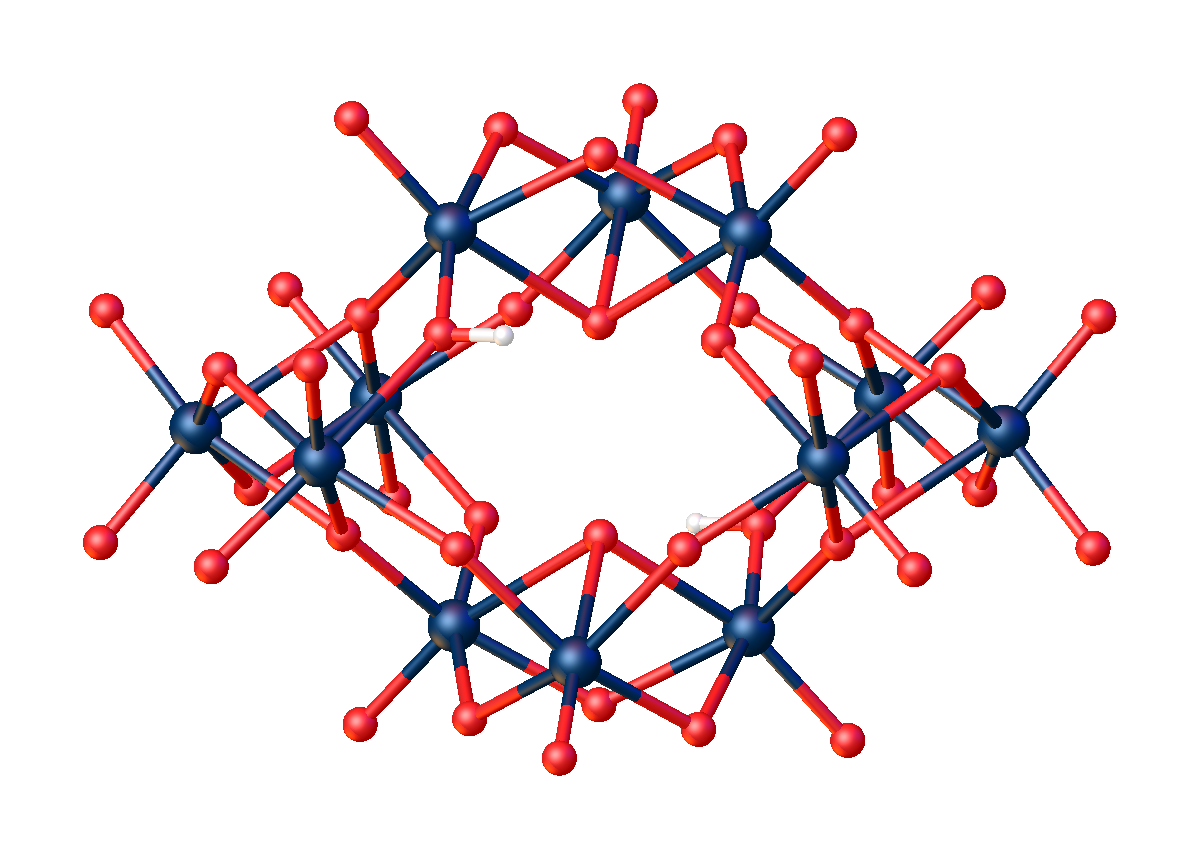
Structure of the paratungstate [H_{2}W_{12}O_{42}]^{10−}, highlighting its relatively low symmetry.

The salt (NH_{4})_{10}[H_{2}W_{12}O_{42}]·4H_{2}O has been characterized by X-ray crystallography.

The unprotonated anion [W_{12}O_{42}]^{12−} has C_{2h} symmetry.

== See also ==
- Metatungstate [W_{12}O_{40}]^{8-}, with idealized T_{d} symmetry.
