= Bush medicine =

Traditional medicine used by Indigenous Australians

Bush medicine comprises traditional medicines used by Indigenous Australians, being Aboriginal and Torres Strait Islander people. Indigenous people have been using various components of native Australian flora and some fauna as medicine for thousands of years, and a minority turn to healers in their communities for medications aimed at providing physical and spiritual healing.

Traditional methods of healing have underwritten the development of non-Indigenous medicines throughout history. One notable example would be the development of a seasickness medication.

Today, traditional healers and medicines have been incorporated into modern clinical settings to help treat sick Indigenous people within some healthcare networks.

== Overview ==
Traditional medicine has been defined as the sum of the total knowledge, skills and practices based on the theories, beliefs and experiences indigenous to different cultures, whether explicable or not, used in the maintenance of health, as well as in the prevention, diagnosis, improvement or treatment of physical and mental illness. Bush medicine is also connected to the holistic worldview in such a way that the interplay between the physical, emotional, social and spiritual aspects is crucial in attaining wellbeing.

The modern world and Aboriginal cultures have differing approaches for health. Whilst conventional medicine deals with direct causes of illness and science-based views of health, the Aboriginal view on health as defined by the National Aboriginal Health Strategy considers "not just the physical well being of the individual, but the social, emotional and cultural well-being of the whole community. This is the whole-of-life view and it also includes the cyclical concept of life-death-life".

Broadly, most human societies see the manifestation of illness as natural, human or supernatural. According to Patrick Maher, the traditional Aboriginal model of illness sees social and spiritual dysfunction as a cause of illness, while supernatural intervention is regarded as the main cause of serious illness. Aboriginal concepts of illness and pain and its causes are quite different from western medicine; for example, a severe headache may be attributed to an evil spirit having taken up residence in the head. It is also believed that damage to sacred sites associated with Dreamtime mythology may cause serious illness. The basic structures and more complex systems of belief need to be understood before the role of bush medicine or traditional healers can be grasped.

Generally, bush medicine in Australia is made from plant materials, such as bark, leaves and seeds, although animal products were used as well. A major component of traditional medicine is herbal medicine, which is the use of natural plant substances to treat or prevent illness. Aboriginal remedies vary among the many Aboriginal groups in different parts of the country. There is no single set of Aboriginal medicines and remedies, just as there is no single Aboriginal language.

== Remedies ==
Herbal medicine is a major component of traditional medicine. The Aboriginal people view E. alternifolia as a medicinal plant and some carry the leaves with them. They use it to treat symptoms of the common cold and flu.

Other plants used in bush medicine includes the leaves of the emu bush, which some Northern Territory Aboriginal people used to sterilise sores and cuts. It could also be gargled when necessary. The stinging nettle has also been used in some Aboriginal bush medicine to treat paralysis and rheumatism.

Mitchell Park, now within Cattai National Park and situated near Sydney Basin in NSW, had many plants that were used as remedies for Aboriginal people. Nine species of eucalyptus present in the park could act as remedies. The red gum kino is known to be rich in astringent tannins. Additionally, this park also contained native plants that were actually used by early European settlers. The nectar-laden liquid from banksia flowers was used as a cough syrup, and from the native grapes (Cissus hypoglauca) a throat gargle was made.

The use of animals and other living things may also be used in bush medicine. In Warrabri, Northern Territory, one believed cure for earache is squeezing the fatty part of a witchetty grub into the sore ear. In Uluru, the purported cure involves squeezing rabbit urine into the ear.

== Healers ==
Aboriginal people believe that their healers, their "medicine men", have special powers which are bestowed upon them by their spiritual ancestors to heal. They have the roles of both a general practitioner and a psychiatrist, healing both the body and mind.

For the Aṉangu of the Western Desert cultural bloc, practitioners of bush medicine are known as ngangkari. They cure illnesses through healing rituals that may involve magic. An example of such ritual would be singing, massaging and sucking to remove a foreign object that has entered the body, and invoking the power of the war god Ancestor Ngurunderi to heal the wounds of soldiers caused by spears and clubs. Aside from physical healing, ngangkaris also act as mental health practitioners, as they try to resolve conflicts within the community and offer advice as well. With every sickness, in addition to giving a diagnosis and advice on suitable remedies, the duty of the ngangkari is also to assess the impact of the sickness to the community.

Many Aboriginal people choose to be treated by bush medicine instead of, or as well as, Western treatments for a number of reasons. These include: some Aboriginal people feel uncomfortable and out of place in a sterilised, Western clinic; Aboriginal bush medicine incorporates physical, spiritual and emotional healing, whereas Western medicine does not; and they believe that by using these treatments they are being drawn closer to their ancestors.

== Modern and non-Indigenous use ==
=== 20th century use ===
A medicine developed by Aboriginal peoples of the eastern states of Australia, from the soft corkwood tree, or Duboisia myoporoides, was used by the Allies in World War II to stop soldiers getting seasick when they sailed across the English Channel on their way to liberate France and defeat Hitler during the Invasion of Normandy. It had been flown over to Europe and developed in great secrecy by Canadian researchers, before the "mystery pill" was dispensed to every participating soldier for the massive military operation, which was pivotal to winning the war but had been delayed several times because of seasickness. Later, it was found that the same medicine could be used in the production of the tropane alkaloid drugs, scopolamine and hyoscyamine, which are useful for eye surgery, and a multi-million dollar industry was built in Queensland based on this substance. As a bush medicine, the substance was or is used by various Aboriginal groups for catching fish, as part of ceremonies, and as a sleeping potion, among other uses.

A 1969 study reported that variety of bush medicine techniques were still being used. In Western Australia and the Northern Territory, eucalypt kino (gum) was drunk for influenza, colds and coughs.

A 1994 survey reported that 22% of the 15,000 Aboriginal people from all over Australia in the sample had practised bush medicine in the previous six months.

=== 21st century use ===
Traditions in southern and eastern Australia have largely been lost, but efforts are being made by anthropologists to record traditions from Aboriginal people in central and north-western Australia. In the Northern Territory, however, it is still relatively well-preserved. Ngangkaris are said to be present in health clinics to perform rituals and give medical advice when necessary.

The use of bush medicine and natural remedies in Australia has declined, partly due to the loss of information. This can primarily be attributed to the effects of colonisation, and policies made to eradicate Aboriginal people's and their culture such as the Stolen Generation. In Aboriginal culture they do not pass on information through writing, but through singing and dancing ceremonies, which are becoming far rarer. This oral traditions means records do not last without a living culture. Without these ceremonies, the tens of thousands of years of knowledge that the Aboriginal elders hold can be lost.

In 2019, the Northern Adelaide Local Health Network developed the first formalised, clinically endorsed mechanism to support ngangkaris working in accessed in acute, rehab, and palliative care inhospitals including Lyell McEwin and Modbury hospitals, as well as other units, including mental health facilities. Traditional healing methods used include Pampuni (healing touch), Mapampa (blowing), and Marali (spiritual healing and bush medicines) to complement mainstream treatment.

As of 2022, research into various types of bush medicine is being carried out by Central Queensland University in consultation with Ghungalu elder Uncle Steve Kemp, who has been providing plant materials including gumby gumby and Alstonia constricta (bitterbark) parts for the project. The study will include examination of the methods used to extract and process the plants.

== See also ==
- Medicinal plants of Australia
- Ngangkari, traditional healers of Anangu
- Prehistoric medicine
- Puckowe, a spirit who comes to the aid of medicine men
