= Kay Lindjuwanga =

- Born: December 31, 1957 (age 68); Mumeka, Northern Territory, Australia
- Known for: Bark painting, contemporary Indigenous Australian art
- Spouse: John Mawurndjul
- Children: Pamela Djawulba, Anna Wurrkidj, Jimbesta/Sylvester Wurrkidj, Noah Wurrkidj, Josephine Wurrkidj, Semeria Wurrkidj
- Father: Peter Marralwanga
- Awards: Bark Painting Prize, 2004 National Aboriginal & Torres Strait Islander Art Award

Kay Lindjuwanga is an Aboriginal Australian artist from Maningrida in the Northern Territory of Australia. She is known for her bark paintings which often make use of Aboriginal rarrk designs.

== Biography ==
Kay Lindjuwanga was born in 1957 and is part of the Kuninjku language group in Australia. Her father is artist, Peter Marralwanga and she learned to paint with the help of her husband and acclaimed artist, John Mawurndjul.

Lindjuwanga grew up with brothers, Ivan Namirrkki and Samuel Namunjdja, who both became successful artists.

Lindjuwanga and Mawurndjul were married in 1973, and Lindjuwanga gave birth to their first child, daughter Pamela Djawulba, later that year. The couple went on to have their second child, daughter Anna Wurrkidj in 1975, and their son Jimbesta (referred to as Sylvester) in 1978. Another son, Noah Wurrkidj was born in 1981, followed by daughters Josephine Wurrkidj and Semeria Wurrkidj are born, in 1983 and 1985, respectively. Their daughter Anna Wurrkidj is now an accomplished painter.

Mawurndjul would help Lindjuwanga develop her skills in art by letting her fill in various sketches he created. This process was also a way of Mawurndjul giving her permission to use his Kurulk clan designs. Lindjuwanga now paints both the clan designs of her husband, and the Kardbam designs from her own clan.

== Career ==
Lindjuwanga followed her husband John Mawurndjul the development of an abstract style of painting, which draws upon ceremonial cross-hatched designs, known as rarrk. As a part of this group, Lindjuwanga uses abstract images inspired by ceremonial designs and ancestral power. Kay Lindjuwanga was awarded the Telstra Bark Painting prize at the National Aboriginal and Torres Strait Islander Art Awards for her work Buluwana at Dilebang on August 13, 2004. The award exhibition was held at the Museum and Art Gallery of the Northern Territory in Darwin between August and November of that year. Her first commercial solo exhibition was at Aboriginal and Pacific Art in Sydney.

== Collections ==
- Art Gallery of New South Wales
- Art Gallery of South Australia
- Hood Museum of Art, Dartmouth College
- Kluge-Ruhe Aboriginal Art Collection of the University of Virginia
- Museum and Art Gallery of the Northern Territory
- Museum Victoria
- National Gallery of Australia
- National Gallery of Victoria

== Significant exhibitions ==
- 2010: The Dreamers, Art Gallery of New South Wales, Sydney, New South Wales, Australia, 09 May 2009–15 Aug 2010
- 2006: Dreaming Their Way: Australian Aboriginal Women Painters. National Museum of Women in the Arts, Washington DC and The Hood Museum of Art at Dartmouth College, Hanover, NH.
- 2004: 21st National Aboriginal and Torres Strait Islander Art Awards. Museum and Art Gallery of the Northern Territory, Darwin
