= Curly Bardkadubbu =

Kunwinjku artist

- Born: c.1924
- Died: 1987; Namokardabu, Northern Territory, Australia

Curly Bardkadubbu (1924–1987) was a Kunwinjku artist who was born in the Kamarrang subsection of the Naborn clan of the Marrkolidjban estate on the Liverpool River. He was known for his paintings on eucalyptus bark.

== Biography ==
Not much is known of Bardkadubbu's early life, one reason being the lack of official record keeping and a second being that Bardkadubbu did not start painting until comparatively late in life. Bardkadubbu did not rise to prominence in the art scene until the late 1970s when he was in his mid-forties. In the late 1970s, Bardkadubbu was tutored in painting by Yirawala when they shared an outstation at Table Hill and Marrkolidjban, which both men helped to establish.

Being so close to this river may be the cause of Bardkadubbu's best known depictions – Namanjwarre the Crocodile. Later in his life, Bardkadubbu would move to Namokarabu (an estate in the Liverpool River region), where his life would come to an end in the year 1987 at the age of 62 or 63 (the reason his exact age is undetermined is because of the lack of records indicating Bardkadubbu's date of birth and subsequently date of death).

== Artistic career ==
Bardkadubbu’s work was selected for a number of major exhibitions in Australia and abroad, including: The Art of Aboriginal Australia, which toured North America from 1974 to 1976; and Aboriginal Art: The Continuing Tradition at the National Gallery of Australia in 1989. Bardkadubbu entered the first National Aboriginal Art Award, established by the Museum and Art Gallery of the Northern Territory in 1984. In 2013, Bardkadubbu's painting Namanjwarre the Estuarine Crocodile was included in the exhibition Old Masters: Australia's Great Bark Artists, organized by the National Museum of Australia.

== Style ==
Bardkadubbu started painting much later than his contemporaries. Because of this he used large barks (up to a meter in length) to make up for his lack of precision from starting painting later. Most of Bardkadubbu's subjects were animals, specifically barramundi, crocodiles, and kangaroos- with crocodiles being the most frequent subject over. Yirawala and Bardkadubbu have the same style of infill in that they both leave space between the rarrk.

== Northern Land Council logo ==
The Northern Land Council's logo is derived from Bardkadubbu's painting Ngalyod the Rainbow Serpent. Bardkadubbu allowed the Northern Land Council to modify the painting for their logo; in return he was paid via copyright fee for allowing the council to use his painting. The logo adapted the painting by rotating Ngalyold the Rainbow Serpent ninety degrees clockwise and changing the water serpent's head. The colors were also slightly enhanced to pop more, but neither the general shape of the water serpent's body nor the interior crosshatching was changed.

== Collections ==
- Art Gallery of New South Wales
- Art Gallery of South Australia
- Museum of Contemporary Art Australia
- National Gallery of Australia
- National Museum of Australia

== Works sold at auction ==
- Kandakidji (Kangaroo)
- Untitled (Rock Wallaby Hunt)
- Namangwarri - Salt Water Crocodile
- Salt Water Crocodile
- Rainbow Serpent
- Ngalkunburriyaymi (The Female Rainbow Serpent)
- Ngalyod the Rainbow Serpent
- Oenpelli, Western Arnhem Land
- Yawkyawk
- Two Works: Saratoga Fish
- Namangurr (Barramundi) and Mimi Spirit
- Namangurr (Barramundi)
- Yawk Yawk Spirit
- Saltwater Crocodiles
- Kundagi, the Kangaroo
- Luma Luma
- Barramundi with Totem Design
- Kunmalng - Dead Person's Spirit
