= Puckowe =

Australian Aboriginal grandmother spirit

In Australian Aboriginal folklore, Puckowe is said to be the "Grandmother spirit" who lives in the sky and comes to the aid of medicine men. The Lower Murray-speaking peoples traditionally believed that Puckowe lives in a dark spot in the Milky Way called the "Coal Sack".
