= Metatungstate =

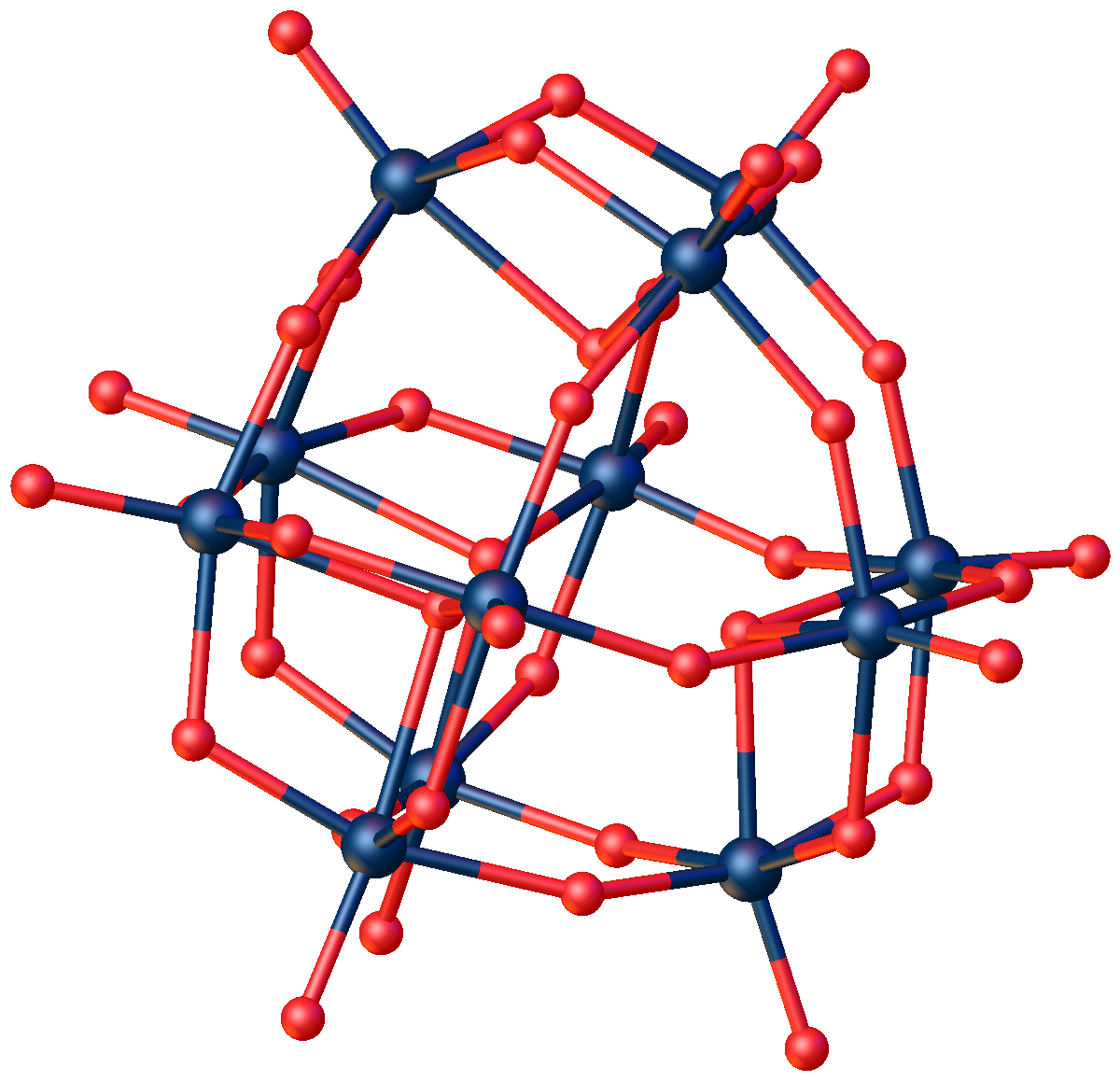
M_{12}O_{40} cage in metatungstate.

In chemistry, metatungstate refers to the anion with the formula [W_{12}O_{40}]^{8−} and salts derived from this anion. The term also refers to protonated derivatives of this anion, including [H_{2}W_{12}O_{40}]^{6−}. The unprotonated anion [W_{12}O_{40}]^{8−} has T_{d} symmetry.

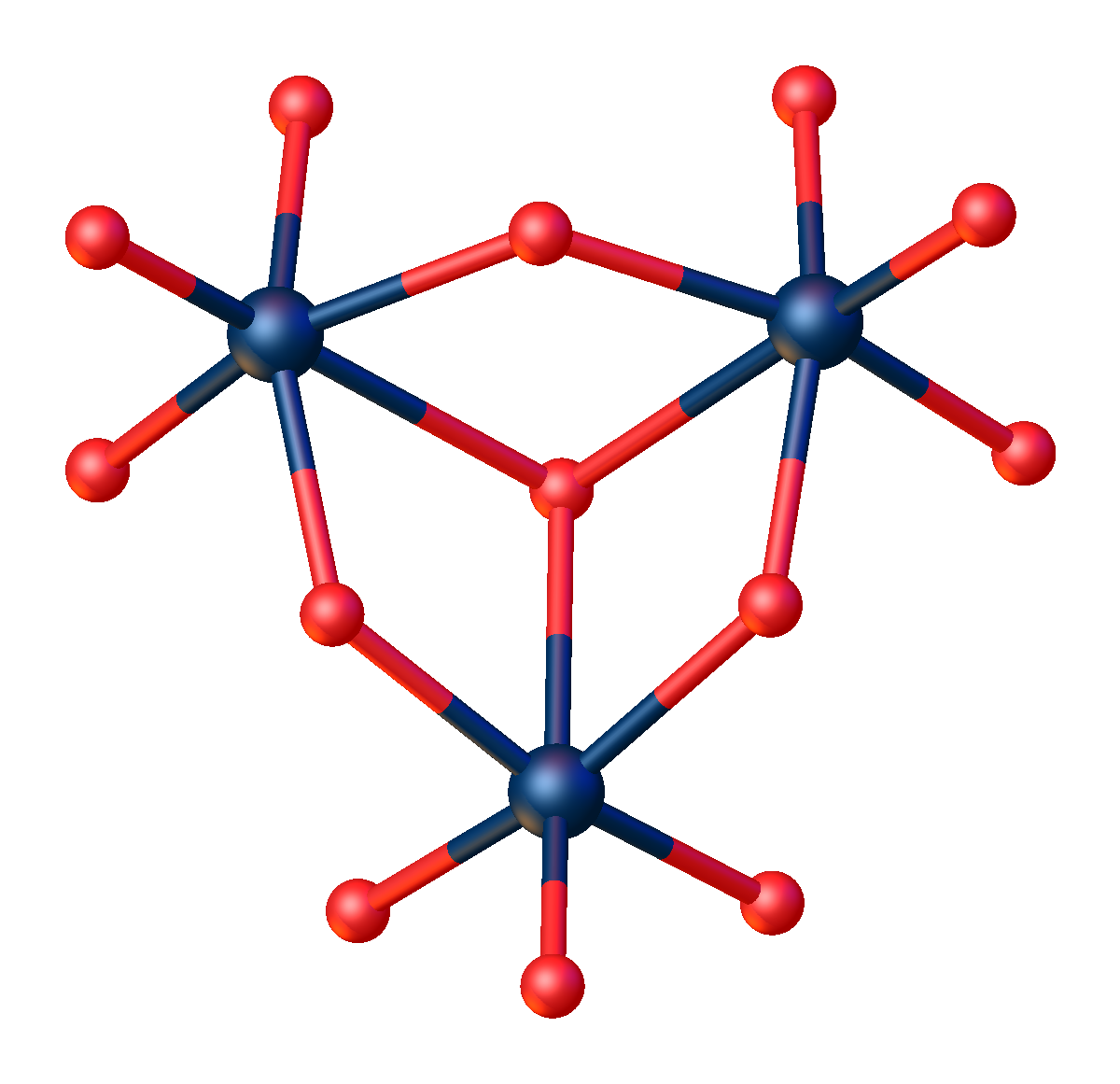
One of four equivalent subunit of the M_{12}O_{40} cage in metatungstate.

== See also ==
- Paratungstate [W_{12}O_{42}]^{12−}, with idealized C_{2h} symmetry.
