= Peter Marralwanga =

Australian Aboriginal painter (1916–1987)

- Born: 1916; West Arnhem Land, Northern Territory, Australia
- Died: 1987 (aged 70–71)
- Known for: Painter
- Style: Bark paintings; rarrk
- Patrons: Yirawala

Peter Marralwanga (1916–1987), also known as Djakku (meaning left-handed), was an Aboriginal Australian artist known for his paintings. He was a member of the Kardbam clan of the Bininj people, and spoke the Kuninjku language. In addition to being a ceremonial leader, Marralwanga also helped found the Marrkolidjban outstation near Maningrida in 1972, with the help of artists Yirawala, Mick Mandayngu and Curly Barrkadubu. For most of his life, Marralwanga lived at the remote outstation, but briefly lived at the government settlement at Maningrida.

Born in 1916 in West Arnhem Land in the Northern Territory of Australia, Marralwanga derived influence from Yirawala, a fellow artist and elder from his community. He is best known for his creation of paintings both on paper and bark. These works reflect the artistic practices of his elders and community, featuring elements of ceremonial and spiritual creatures alongside the cross-hatching pattern known as rarrk. He taught younger artists of his region including his son, Ivan Namirrki, and nephew, John Mawurndjul. Not only did Marralwanga possess an "intimate firsthand knowledge of the religious geography" of his country (which he passed on to his sons), but he also aided in the technical aspects of painting, sometimes even re-tracing the work of his sons to correct or improve the figuration. He is regarded as an inspirational painter not only to such famous artists as John Marwurndjul, but also for his daughter Kay Lindjuwanga, who adapted Marralwanga's stories into her own bark paintings.

== Career ==
Marralwanga began to paint during his mid 50s, starting around 1970. Under the guidance of Yirawala, Marralwanga began to incorporate ceremonial items in his works. His later style was further influenced by Yirawala. In Kuninjku art, much artistic content is sacred, and artists have strict guidelines on what they can depict in their works. Artists who have special roles within a community may receive exclusive rights to paint certain images. Due to his age he gained permission from to incorporate ceremonial elements and knowledge into his work. His use of rarrk strayed from its original use for mortuary painting. Through his designs, Marralwanga represented the power of the original ancestral spirits, the Djang. In fact, the designs that these Djang wore on their bodies were first translated to body paintings of indigenous people during ceremony, and then served as the inspiration for bark painters such as Peter Marralwanga. He passed his knowledge of rarrk to a new generation of artists and was an inspiration in their works.

While much of Marralwanga's work was derived from ceremony, he incorporated elements from his own life and experiences. Marralwanga described the inclusion in his work of both ceremony and personal experiences as "half secret one, half ordinary one." This combination saw him create a diverse body of work. Rather than employing one style of cross-hatching, Marralwanga innovated and created, using contrasting colors, styles and application techniques to make his works "jump with life." One such way of achieving this effect would be to visually cram a large ancestral figure within the edges of the bark, so that the "figures' spiritual energy appears to be compressed in physical form... waiting to be unleashed." Alongside Yirawala, Marralwanga was one of the first Kunwinjku artists to experiment with painting the subject so large that it takes up nearly all of the available bark space. This change brought greater emphasis to the power and movement offered by the rarrk to fill in the painting's subject. Yet, Marralwanga remained true to his ancestral roots even in his experiments; drawing his use of brightly colored rarrk contrasted with dotted lines directly from body designs that would be painted on during ceremony. Using his unique style, Marralwanga creates pieces that speak as political agents; highlighting indigenous rights to their land as well as the preservation of their culture.

== Works ==
- Peter Marralwanga, Kuninjku people, Ngal-Kunburriyaymi 1982
- Ngalyod, the Rainbow Serpent, at Manabinbala, 1980-81
- Mimih Spirit Dancing at Catfish Ceremony, 1979
- Kangaroo with Headdress and Spirit Figures, c. 1980s

== Exhibitions ==
- 1981: Solo exhibition at Mary Macha at Aboriginal Traditional Arts
- 1983: Solo exhibition at Mary Macha at Aboriginal Traditional Arts
- 1989: A Myriad of Dreaming: Twentieth Century Aboriginal Art
- 1991: Aboriginal Art and Spirituality
- 2004: Crossing Country- the Alchemy of Western Arnhem Land Art
