= John Mawurndjul =

Contemporary Aboriginal Australian artist

Balang Nakurulk AM
- Born: 1952; Mumeka, Northern Territory, Australia
- Died: 21 December 2024 (aged 71–72)
- Other names: Mowundjul, Mawandjul, Mowandjul, Mowundjal, Mawundjurl, Mawurndjurl, Johnny Mawurndjul
- Known for: Bark painting, contemporary Indigenous Australian art
- Spouse: Kay Lindjuwanga
- Parent(s): Anchor Kulunba, Mary Wurrdjedje
- Relatives: Pamela Djawulba (daughter), Anna Wurrkidj (daughter), Josephine Wurrkidj (daughter), Semeria Wurrkidj (daughter)
- Website: https://www.johnmawurndjul.com/

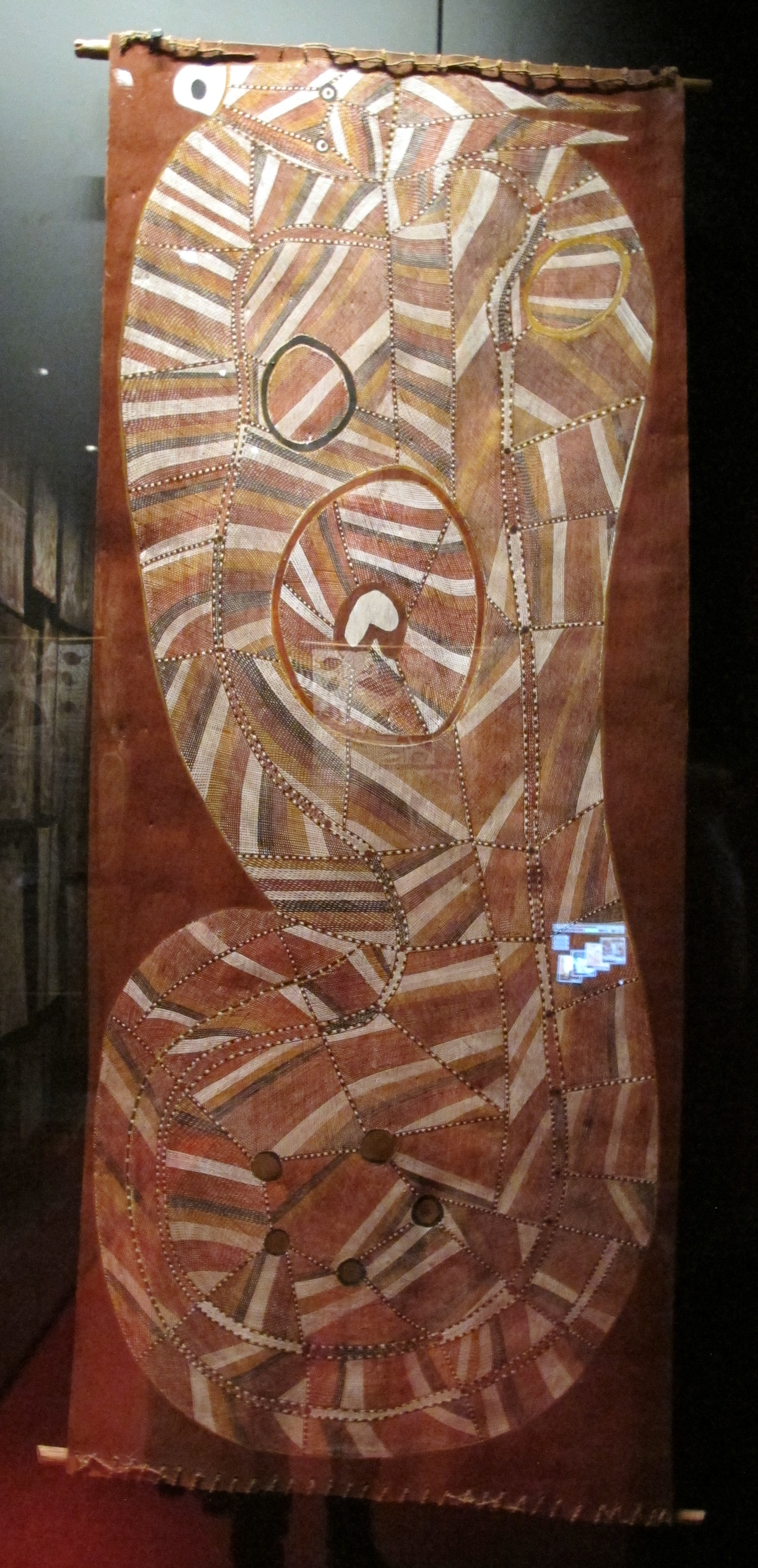
Rainbow serpent by John Mawurndjul, 1991. Musée du quai Branly, Paris

Balang Nakurulk (1952–2024) was an Australian contemporary Indigenous artist. He uses traditional motifs to express spiritual and cultural values. He is known for his creations based on the traditional cross-hatching style of bark painting technique known as rarrk. However, he is also known for carving, weaving, and batik.

== Personal life ==
Balang was born in 1952 in Mumeka, a traditional camping ground for members of the Kurulk clan, on the Mann River, about 50 kilometres (31 mi) south of Maningrida. He is a member of the Kuninjku people of West Arnhem Land, Northern Territory, and grew up immersed in traditional life with extended family, having only occasional contact with non-indigenous people and culture. Born in the bush south of Maningrida, Balang has based his life on Kurulk clan lands that stretch between the Liverpool, Mann and Tomkinson Rivers and moved between seasonal camps along these rivers with family. This tract of sparsely populated tropical woodland is some 500 kilometres east of Darwin and accessible by dirt road only during the dry season. Steeped in ancestral narratives and abundant in plant and animal life, the area features ancient rock art galleries that skirt the northern rim of the Arnhem Plateau. As of May 2010 he was living a traditional lifestyle at an outstation near Maningrida, still painting and hunting. While living in this outstation, he suffered from the early stages of Leprosy, and did not enjoy life as traditional ceremonies and language were banned. However, he was recognized as a formidable hunter and was considered by critic John McDonald to be an artistic prodigy by his family.

Balang was introduced to ritual painting in 1969 by his father Anchor Kulunba (c. 1920 – 1996). Balang's art practices began through his participation in the Mardayin ceremony, where he learned to paint rarrk on bodies and ceremonial objects. In ensuing years under the instruction of his older brother Jimmy Njiminjuma (1947 – 2004) and Peter Marralwanga (1916 – 1987), he became a proficient bark painter developing expertise unique to this form of practice: the harvesting and preparation of the stringybark support, cartographic knowledge of sacred ochre deposits and skills to grind, mix and fix their coloured pigments, and the fashioning of sedge rushes into delicate single-strand brushes. Under Njiminjuma's watch, Balang was also introduced to long-established Kuninjku conventions dictating subject matter and its iconography, the characteristics of which have been explored at length by anthropologist Luke Taylor in his pioneering analysis of Western Arnhem Land art. According to Luke Taylor, Balang has played a large role in redefining Kuninjku artistic tradition by incorporating ceremonial motifs into contemporary art. About Balang, Luke Taylor has also stated, "Mawurndjul is a man who impresses all who meet him with his energy and drive. He is a remarkable hunter who will work hard all day to obtain the highly prized bush foods that he will share with his relatives."

Growing up during the late 20th century, Balang experienced an era when the government of Australia was beginning to have a greater reach into Arnhem Land; a phenomenon that influenced his art throughout his career. Throughout his life, ration depots became commercialized villages and towns in the region that fundamentally changed the lives of indigenous people. Through his work, Balang addresses the complex colonial relationships that spawned from this development. Balang's works uses Kuninjku knowledge, embed stories, laws, and ceremony to create visual art. Mawurndjul was married to fellow artist Kay Lindjuwanga. Together, they had several children, including daughters Anna Wurrkidj, Josephine Wurrkidj, and Semeria Wurrkidj, who have followed in their father's artistic footsteps. His family continues to uphold and evolve the Kuninjku artistic traditions.

Balang is the leader of many religious traditions. In the early 1990s, he and his family established an outpost in Milmilngkan at a billabong, a spiritually significant lake that serves as a sacred site of the Ngalyod, the rainbow serpent that he depicts and honors in much of his artwork.

== Art ==
Balang is known for his use of ‘rarrk'. This is a form of crosshatched linework used in Arnhem Land ceremonial painting. His application of the technique creates a dynamic visual effect, making the art visually interesting. Balang's use of rarrk is not simply for decoration, rather, it often makes the viewer feel a little unsure of what they’re seeing. The way the lines move and shift gives the artwork a sense of motion or flickering, which draws people in and makes them observe more deeply. This kind of visual confusion actually connects to how Kuninjku people understand their ceremonies, where not everything is meant to be seen clearly or understood right away. Balang's use of rarrk marked a major turning point in bark painting. Mawurndjul was the first bark painter to successfully challenge the hegemony of the Desert and Kimberley styles within the terms of contemporary. He introduced new ways of showing space, adding depth, and creating visual effects through his cross-hatching techniques. His approach also brought new perspectives to the composition of bark paintings, mixing traditional techniques with a more experimental, personal style. These grid structures and the occasional exposures of the under layers of paint create a bir'yin' ("brilliance," "shining," "shimmering") effect, a quality of reminiscent of wangarr marr, or ancestral power. For Mawurndjul, the aesthetic effects on his paintings are not just for visuals. The rarrk patterns express the strength of Ancestral power and are known to have a spiritual purpose rather than a stylistic intent. His ceiling murals, for example, use these visual effects to imitate the power of Ngalyod. Later he produced paintings of Ngalyod that showed its body with dazzling zigzags of colour. Some early works show detailed compositions with Ngalyod encircling other Djang and pulling them into the ground. While these paintings have a light-emitting effect, the designs are not as powerful as those of ceremonial paintings, and the power coming from rarrk bark paintings is a "manifestation" of ancestral powers. Mawurndjul's 2018–2019 retrospective, John Mawurndjul: I Am the Old and the New, showcased his innovative use of rarrk (crosshatching) and his focus on sacred sites in Arnhem Land. Critics noted that his work challenges the dichotomy between traditional and contemporary art, positioning him as a pivotal figure in redefining Indigenous Australian art within the global contemporary art scene. Balang's later work also includes circle shapes on top of the rarrk pattern, creating a visual effect that seems to make these circles "float" or even form figures with the grid that encapsulate more complex meanings. In his Madayin series, these circles are seen to be reminiscent of waterholes, which also contain ancestral powers. In Balang's words:

"Mardayin phenomena are located in water,

underneath bodies of water. Water is on the top and

Mardayin is underneath… it is always in the water."

He was tutored in rarrk, a traditional painting technique using fine cross-hatching and infill, in the 1970s by his uncle Peter Marralwanga and elder brother Jimmy Njiminjuma and began producing small paintings on bark. Some even considered him an "artistic prodigy" at the time. In 1979, Balang began painting for the market, in which much of his works were small bark paintings that depicted animals and spirits, including bambirl (echidna), ngaldadmurrng (saratoga fish), birlmu (large barramundi fish), mimih spirits, yawkyawk and Ngalyod (the Rainbow Serpent). While he was best known for his bark paintings, Balang also contributed to the mimih sculpture tradition that was created by his father-in-law Crusoe Kuningbal. These spirit figures are carved from softwood and have become important to the Maningrida region. Two examples of these early works are Ngaldadmurrng saratoga (1979) and Ngalyod, the Rainbow Serpent at Dilebang (c.1979). During the 1980s he began producing larger and more complex works, and in 1988 won a Rothmans Foundation Award. 1988 also marked the year in which Balang's worked gained heavy momentum being displayed in many exhibitions in Australia and overseas. Some of his inspiration draws from Yirawala, Midjawmidjaw, Paddy Compass, and other artists. Balang also takes strong inspiration from various sacred places. Balang before he starts new works will look across the Kurulk clan estate for inspiration.

Over Balang's career he has employed many different techniques, some from his culture and others he has created himself. In the beginning of his career Balang stuck to his roots through creating many images of important figures in Aboriginal art such as the rainbow serpent Ngalyod. In later years he has emphasized a "geometric aesthetic", using Mardayin ceremony body paintings in his works and making them his own. This geometric aesthetic can also be seen in his 1988 work Nawarramulmui (Shooting Star Spirit), which features shapes with straight lines and solid colors instead of rarrk, while still being on bark. This painting also still connects back to his themes of tradition and culture, as it represents a supernatural nighttime figure. Many of Balang's paintings map his ancestral lands and reference sacred sites. These places are associated with Mardayin ceremonies and ancestral narratives. For instance, in Madayin Ceremony (2000), Balang uses trianglular shapes hidden in a rectangular grid near the top of the work, similar to a body painting from the Kakodbebuldi region. In fact, because the contemporary art world has started to consider his work as such, Balang clarified that this geometric experimentation was not in attempts to stray from traditional Madayin ceremonies, but to avoid using designs that would uncover their sacred and secret meanings in his works that are produced for the market. Using the term "contemporary" when it comes to both Aboriginal and Balang's work or focusing on its inspiration, the artist's individualism, innovation, or surface-level features of the works takes the art away from its ancestral roots. Mawurndjul has shared his art with the world while staying true to Kuninjku cultuyre. He only includes ceremonial designs in his work and keeps sacred ones private. Another important thing to note about his work is that "he is a history painter, not a landscape painter."

While painting on bark has been Balang's primary medium, the artist has also produced many figurative carvings and lorrkon (hollow log coffins), bringing them to life with his finely painted imagery, and he has forayed briefly into printmaking. All the materials for his art production, bark, ochres, and brushes can be sourced on his country as they are for ceremony. Balang, despite showing deep respect and honoring tradition and his culture constantly in his work, that he is always finding new ways to express himself through his art. Balang states, "I have my own style, my own ideas. I always think of new ways to paint, I always look for something different."

Throughout the 90s, Mawurundjul's work was included in major exhibitions displaying Aboriginal Australian art, most notably, Dreamings in New York (1988), Magiciens de la Terre in Paris, France (1989), Crossroads in Japan (1992), Aratjara: Art of the first Australians in Germany and the UK (1993–1994), and In the heart of Arnhem Land in France (2001). Additionally, in 1995 Balang began to diversify his practices, and he began to aid in both rock art tourism and environmental management.

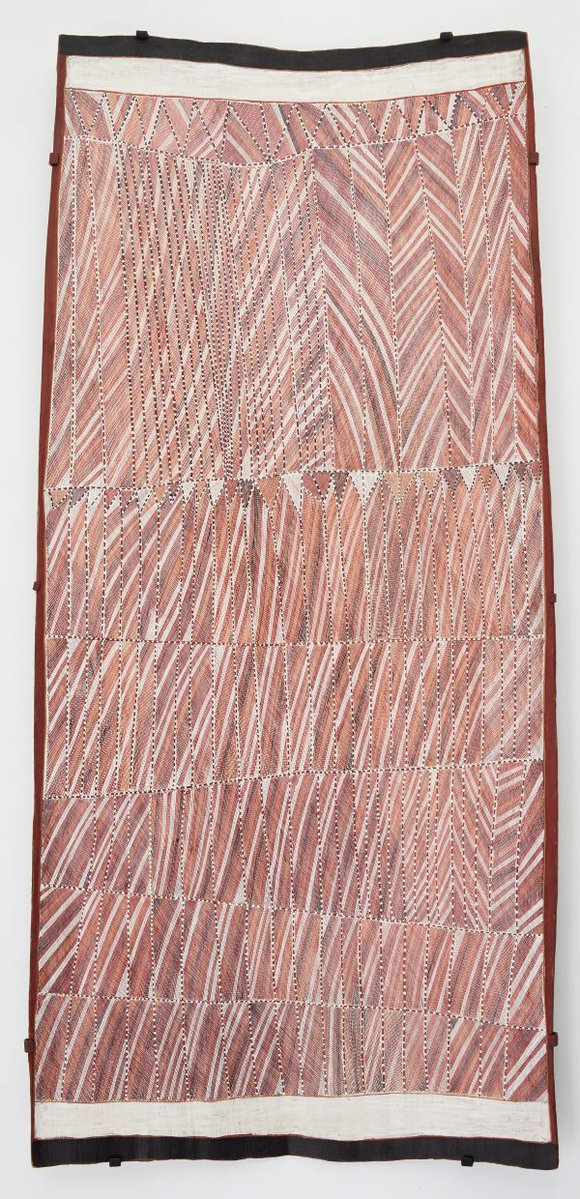
Mardayin ceremony by John Mawurndjul, 2000.

In 2000, Balang's work was amongst that of eight individual and collaborative groups of Indigenous Australian artists shown in the prestigious Nicholas Hall at the Hermitage Museum in Russia. The exhibition received a positive reception from Russian critics, one of whom wrote: "This is an exhibition of contemporary art, not in the sense that it was done recently, but in that it is cased in the mentality, technology and philosophy of radical art of the most recent times. No one, other than the Aborigines of Australia, has succeeded in exhibiting such art at the Hermitage.

Also in 2000, his work was featured at the Sydney Biennale.

In 2004, twenty-two of Balang's works were curated by Hetti Perkins in Crossing Country at the Art Gallery of New South Wales in Sydney, Australia in attempts to detach common perception of market engagements with contemporary Aboriginal art, as well the use of bark as a medium. Crossing Country looked at the history of western Arnhem Land's artists and how they communicated and inspired each other.

In 2006, Mawurndjul created a ceiling mural along with a carved and painted Lorrkkon funerary pole, used in reburial ceremonies, for the MQBJC bookshop of the Musée du quai Branly Jacques Chirac in Paris, as part of the Australian Indigenous Art Commission. These works, within the architecture of one of Europe's most prominent museums of world cultures, had Kuninjku cultural meaning. The water lily, or Wyuk, is a recurring symbol in his work, for example, the MQBJC Lorrkkon. The lily reflects key aspects of the Nygalyod mythos, such as spiritual connectivity, fertility, and rebirth.

Mawurndjul's Mardayin at Milmilngkan (2006) ceiling mural inhabits the MQBJC's gift shop. Despite creating important museum architecture, like the Musée du Quai Branly, Balang's contributions are often minimized in the public. This raises concerns about the recognition and appreciation of Indigenous work. After completing this work, Balang was recognised by French president, Jacques Chirac, as the 'maestro' at the museum's inauguration. He was also famously photographed in front of the Eiffel Tower in Time magazine.

His work was subsequently the subject of a major retrospective in Basel, Switzerland (2005) and in the Sprengel Museum in Hanover, Germany (2006). This made Balang the first Australian artist to have received a retrospective at two leading museums in Europe.

In 2013, Mawurndjul's work was featured alongside Danie Mellor's in a two-person exhibition at Tolarno Galleries in Melbourne. The pairing underscored contrasting yet complementary approaches to Indigenous identity and storytelling: while Mellor used Western materials like porcelain and photography, Mawurndjul remained rooted in bark painting and traditional materials. The exhibition highlighted Mawurndjul's ongoing relevance and adaptability in contemporary curatorial contexts, emphasizing cross-generational and cross-cultural dialogues in Indigenous art.

In 2018–2019 an exhibition of his work was shown in the Museum of Contemporary Art Australia and afterwards as part of Tarnanthi 2018 at the Art Gallery of South Australia. The exhibition, titled John Mawurndjul: I am the Old and the New at the Museum of Contemporary Art showcased a collection of bark paintings from one of the leading custodians of the land in Australia. The exhibition highlighted Balang's spiritual heritage, which is reflected in his art, and the paradox of bark painting as both an ancient and new form of artistic expression. The exhibition was arranged according to moiety, the two ritual groups that divide a people, and the artist requested not to hang works in chronological order to reflects an Indigenous sense of time. The exhibition showcased Balang's large-scale bark paintings, which he began making in the late 1980s after a dream and inspired by visits to art museums. This exhibition showcased places of special cultural significance called kunred, along with the sacred places, spirits, and various animals that are integral to his artwork, has been developed under the leadership of the artist himself, and is described in both Kuninjku and English. This was the first major exhibition of his work in Australia.

Balang always cites a strong spiritual connection to ancestors, land, and the country in his artworks. He states, "I am only painting the land. I paint the power of that land. They are big places, sometimes dangerous and have a lot of power." Mawurndjul's bark paintings are deeply rooted in the ceremonial and ancestral traditions of Western Arnhem Land, yet they also operate within the global contemporary art world. Anthropologists Frances Morphy and Howard Morphy highlight how Mawurndjul and his peers distinguish between paintings made for external audiences and those created for ceremonial use. While some may view artworks sold to galleries or tourists as "tourist art," within his community there remains an understanding that even these works can authentically express sacred meaning when done with proper intent and knowledge. According to Taylor et al., Mawurndjul's work reflects a conscious assertion of cultural continuity while also engaging with broader contemporary artistic discourses. This tension between innovation and inheritance is a defining feature of his practice, making his work both culturally grounded and internationally resonant.

== Legacy ==
Balang lived at Milmilngkan, his ancestral lands, where he participated in ceremonies and used materials sourced from his country for both art and sustenance. Milmilngkan is an important place in Mawurndjul's art. It is meaningful to him personally and spiritually, connecting his life story and art to his ancestors. Balang's art has been featured in numerous exhibitions across Australia, Europe, and the world, including the retrospective "rarrk" John Mawurndjul: Journey through Time in Northern Australia at the Tinguely Museum in Basel in 2005 and the major retrospective John Mawurndjul: I Am the Old and the New, organised by the Museum of Contemporary Art in Sydney in 2018. John Mawurndjul: I Am the Old and the New combined works of art from both national and international collections produced over Balang's four decade career.

Through his art, Balang became the first Australian artist to be given a retrospective at two separate major European museums. Between 2005 and 2006 his work was displayed at Museum Tinguely in Basel, Switzerland, and Sprengel Museum in Hanover, Germany.

Balang participated in the curation of the exhibition, which was organized by kunred which are special areas of cultural significance for the Kuninjku people. This major international exhibition solidified his status as a globally recognized contemporary artist, bridging Indigenous Australian art with the European art world. A lot of Balang's work is inspired by Mardayin ceremonies, which are very important in his culture. He doesn't show the ceremonies directly. Instead, he uses patterns and shapes to depict the stories behind them. This way, he can share the meaning of these traditions while still keeping the secret message hidden. Even though Balang's work is based on old stories and cultural practices, his use of abstract designs and detailed patterns lets people from all over the world connect with it. He finds a way to share his culture through art that feels both traditional and modern at the same time, without losing what makes it special to his community. Additionally, this exhibition is noted to be the first time the Museum of Contemporary Art in Sydney has held an entirely bilingual exhibition. Mawurndjul's interactions with France were facilitated by Apolline Kohen, the French-speaking arts adviser at Maningrida Arts and Culture, who was able to lobby on his behalf for his commission mural to be included in the bookshop of the MQBJC. zMawurndjul's broader reputation as a contemporary artist may be recovered from the vast wealth of materials, and his works may be considered contemporary in the sense that he works within a local Kuninjku history of art, maintains an awareness of the techniques used by a succession of other bark painters, yet brings his own new ideas and skills to this creativity. Through his Kuninjku knowledge and his use of spiritual elements, Balang challenges contemporary Western art-historical frameworks. His practices show how Indigenous art can serve ceremonial, aesthetic, and epistemological functions.

Balang is recognised as a contemporary artist in Australian, French, and global art circles. His reputation was built on his engagement with new projects, enthusiastic cultural expansiveness with researchers and curators, and his energy at painting.

Balang has been a major influence on contemporary Kuninjku artists, and he has tutored his wife, Kay Lindjuwanga and daughter Anna Wurrkidj, who are now accomplished painters. He has created a whole school of artists and led an Australian art movement. Balang and fellow artist John Bulunbulun had a respectful and creative relationship. Balang liked to experiment with new ideas in traditional art, while Bulunbulun focused on perfecting the old techniques. Their different styles helped shape the Kuninjku art movement and showed how versatile Aboriginal art can be. Balang also stores away Mardayin sacred objects painted with the ‘inside,' or secret, designs, which, should other artists wish to paint similar designs, they must come to him for his approval. His influence can also be seen through his many awards he was won throughout his career. Balang stated that his paintings aren't about aesthetics, but rather emphasizing ancestral power.

Balang died peacefully in Maningrida on 21 December 2024. According to Indigenous protocols he is to be known as Balang Nakurulk until a period of mourning is complete.

== Recognition and awards ==
In 1988, Balang was awarded the Rothmans Foundation Award for best painting in traditional media as well as first prize in the Barunga Festival Art exhibition.

In 1999, 2002, and 2016 Balang was awarded the bark painting prize at the Telstra National Aboriginal and Torres Strait Islander Art Award.

In 2003, Balang was awarded the prestigious Clemenger Contemporary Art Award at the National Gallery of Victoria, recognizing his significant contributions to contemporary Indigenous art in Australia. The Clemenger Contemporary Art Award is a national prize that includes both Aboriginal and non-Aboriginal Australian artists. Reflecting on the award, Balang viewed it as a turning point in the world's perception of art, stating it demonstrated that "Aboriginal art and non-Aboriginal art were now considered ‘level’."

2003 also saw Balang named by Australian Art Collector magazine as one of the country's 50 most collectible artists. His works have been singled out for praise by many critics, including Art Gallery of New South Wales senior curator Hetti Perkins, and artist Danie Mellor.

In 2007, Mawurndjul was featured on the cover of UNTITLED. Portraits of Australian Artists, a photographic monograph by Sonia Payes published by Macmillan Art Publishing.

In 2010, Balang became a Member of the Order of Australia. This was because of his work in preserving the Aboriginal culture and artistic style through his work.

In addition to awards, Mawurndjul was featured in various Aboriginal books. He was featured in Crossing Country the Alchemy of Western Arnhem Land Art (Art Gallery of New South Wales, 2004). Mawurndjul was also the sole subject of exhibition catalogue 'Rarrk': John Mawurndjul: Journey through Time in Australia (Museum Tinguely and C Kauffman (eds), Crawford House Publishing, Belair, South Australia, 2005). In 2009, Mawurndjul was the subject of another smaller publication, John Mawurndjul: Survey 1979-2009 (Apolline Kohen (curator), ANU Drill Hall Gallery, Canberra, 2009), and also of Between Indigenous Australia and Europe: John Mawurndjul, a collection of scholarly essays compiled from a seminar in that accompanied 'Rarrk' exhibition at the Museum Tinguely in Basel. The several publications featuring Mawurndjul is largely due to his reputation. As a Kuninjku Elder based in the area serviced by Maningrida (Western Arnhem Land), he is the most celebrated contemporary artist from Arnhem Land. The exhibition catalogues, 'Rarrk' and Crossing Country, are both high-quality reproductions that are of a high calibre and provide a greater insight into Mawurndjul and his art than the symposium. The symposium essays are divided into four parts, of which the first focuses on Mawurndjul and his art. The first section consist of accounts that Ryan and Taylor give of Mawurndjul's aesthetic, with Ryan taking a very formalist perspective focusing on the material-specificity of bark painting, and Taylor's anthropological background embedding Mawurndjul's aesthetic moves within social contexts. The remaining three parts of Between Indigenous Australia and Europe discuss not only Mawurndjul's arts, but its provocation within the European context. The issue 'Rarrk' catalogue gives further insight into the mix of disciplines, such as anthropologists, art historians, curators, and artists.

=== Australia Council for the Arts ===
The Australia Council for the Arts is the arts funding and advisory body for the Government of Australia. Since 1993, it has awarded a Red Ochre Award. It is presented to an outstanding Indigenous Australian (Aboriginal Australian or Torres Strait Islander) artist for lifetime achievement.

Year	Nominee / work	Award	Result
2018	himself	Red Ochre Award	Awarded

== Collections ==
- Sprengel Museum, Hannover, Germany
- Aboriginal Art Museum, Utrecht, The Netherlands
- Linden Museum, Stuttgart, Germany
- Museum der Kultren, Basel, Switzerland
- Sammlung Esl, Klosternenburg, Austria
- The Laverty Collection, Private Collection, Sydney, Australia
- The Kaplan-Lein Collection, Private Collection, United States of America
- Wesfarmers Collection, Perth, Australia
- Musee de Quai Branly, Paris, France
- Groninger Museum, Groningen, The Netherlands
- British Museum, UK
- Macquarie Bank Art Collection, Australia
- Charles Darwin University Art Collection, Darwin, Australia
- Laverty Collection, Sydney, Australia
- Ballarat Fine Art Gallery, Ballarat, Australia
- Art Gallery of South Australia, Adelaide, Australia
- Walonia Aboriginal Art, The Netherlands
- The Holmes á Court Collection, Perth, Australia
- South Australian Museum, Adelaide, Australia
- Queensland Art Gallery, Brisbane, Australia
- Parliament House Art Collection, Canberra, Australia
- National Maritime Museum, Darling Harbour, Sydney, Australia
- Museum of Contemporary Art, Maningrida Collection, Sydney, Australia
- National Gallery of Victoria, Melbourne, Australia
- National Gallery of Australia, Canberra, Australia
- Museum and Art Gallery of the Northern Territory, Darwin, Australia
- Kluge-Ruhe Aboriginal Art Collection of the University of Virginia, Charlottesville, Virginia, USA
- Djomi Museum, Maningrida, Australia
- Artbank, Sydney, Australia
- Art Gallery of Western Australia, Perth, Australia
- Art Gallery of New South Wales, Sydney, Australia
- Aimee Proost Private Collection, Queensland, Australia

== See also ==
- List of Indigenous Australian visual artists
