= Australian Aboriginal fibre sculpture =

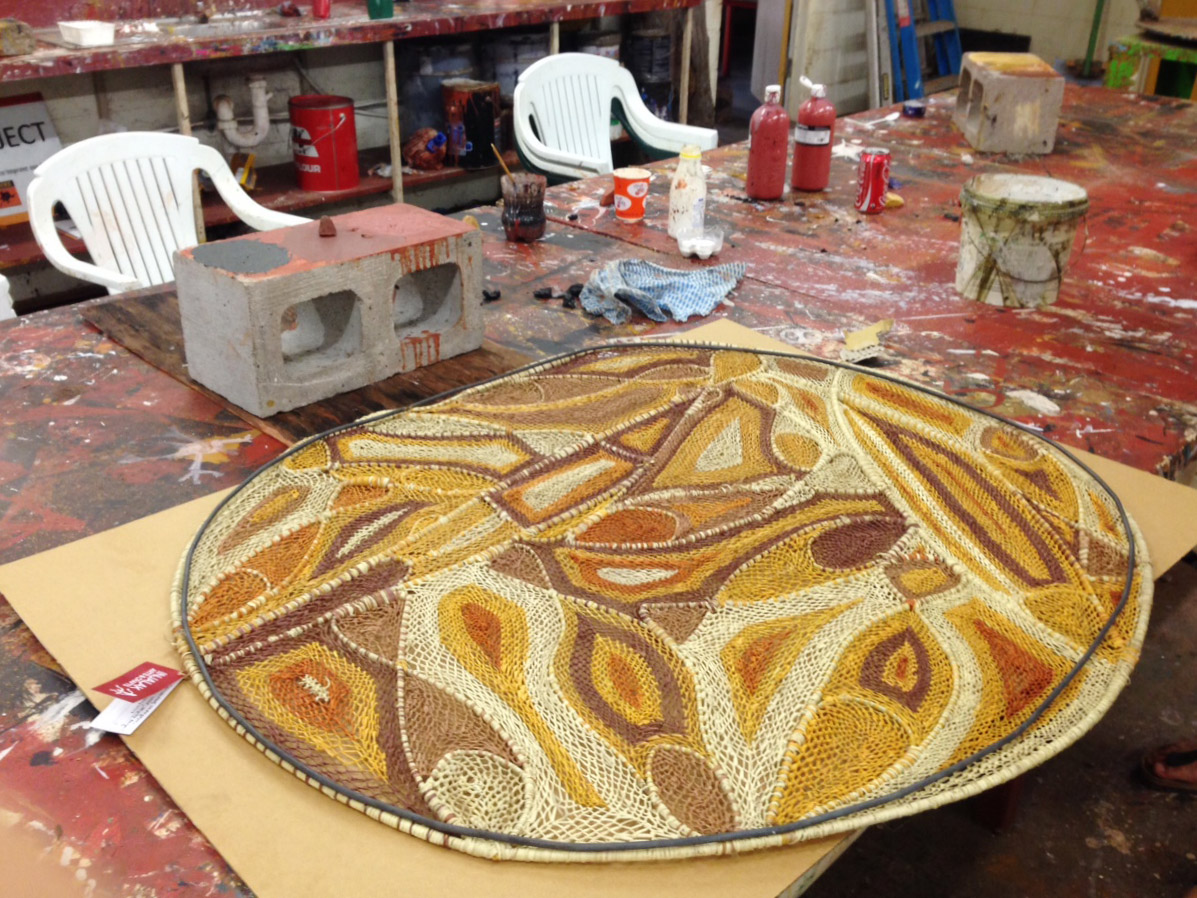
The screenprinting room at Injalak Arts in Gunbalanya. The work on the table is by Ganbaladj Nabegeyo and is typical of the Kuninjku fibre sculpture tradition.

The production of sculptural fibre objects has a long history within Aboriginal Australian culture. Historically, such objects had practical or ceremonial purposes, and some appeared in both contexts. The terms “art” and “craft” are difficult to apply in historical contexts, as they are not originally Aboriginal conceptual divisions. However, in a contemporary context, these objects are now generally regarded as contemporary art whenever they are presented as such. This categorisation is often applied to objects with historically practical or ceremonial applications, as well as a growing category of new fibre forms which have been innovated in the past decades and produced for a fine art market. The border between Aboriginal fibre sculpture and fibre craft is not clearly delineated, and some works may be regarded as either depending on the context of their display and use.

== Traditional Aboriginal fibre sculpture ==
There are various examples of sculptural fibre works in pre-contact Aboriginal societies. Among the Rembarrnga people of Central Arnhem Land, sculptural fibre objects are a central feature of ceremony. Participants dance with animal figures, which are constructed by binding a core of paperbark or grass with string made from bark or other fibres. Thus a dancer may take on the identity of the Ancestor figure. Djondjon or djawurn-djawurn figures from central and western Arnhem Land have a similar construction, but depict human forms. These were left behind at campsites which people had vacated. A longer or raised arm indicated to others the direction in which the group had gone.

== Entry of Aboriginal fibre works into the contemporary art market ==
Aboriginal fibre works until the later decades of the 20th century were almost universally regarded and marketed as ethnographic or craft items. However various factors, beginning around the 1970s, began to see fibre works enter the fine art market. First among these was the Australian government support for Aboriginal art centres, which increased from around the 1970s. This provided more marketing, feedback and art world exposure to practitioners, which encouraged them to create innovative and ambitious products and exhibit their traditional works in new contexts. Parallel to this, a number of exhibitions and awards began to exhibit fibre works in a fine art context, which helped change public and collector perceptions. These included the exhibitions Maningrida: The Language of Weaving (1989), Spinifex Runner (1999) and Twined Together (2005), as well as awards such as the National Aboriginal & Torres Strait Islander Art Award (NATSIAA). Major galleries such as the Museum of Contemporary Art in Sydney and the Queensland Art Gallery in Brisbane also began to exhibit fibre works within their collections as fine art.

Most Aboriginal fibre artists are women, originally trained in making practical items such as fish traps, baskets, string bags and mats. However many urban Aboriginal artists have been inspired to learn traditional weaving skills, often using innovative materials or translating fibre works into other media such as cast metal and glass.

== Development in different communities ==
=== Rembarrnga ===
One of the earliest developments in contemporary Aboriginal fibre art came in 1994, when Kune-speaking artist Lena Yarinkura and her husband Rembarrnga artist Bob Burruwal began innovating with a traditional technique, the binding of paperbark with string or bark fibres. This technique follows that of creating djondjon animal figures for ceremonial use. Their first work, Family Drama (1994) won that year’s Wandjuk Marika Three-Dimensional Award at the National Aboriginal and Torres Strait Islander Art Award. Yarinkura has gone on to a long and innovative career in fibre sculpture, also experimenting with using fish trap weaving techniques to represent the bodies of spirit beings. Maningrida Arts and Culture (MAC) in Maningrida represents the majority of artists working in this tradition.

=== Kuninjku ===
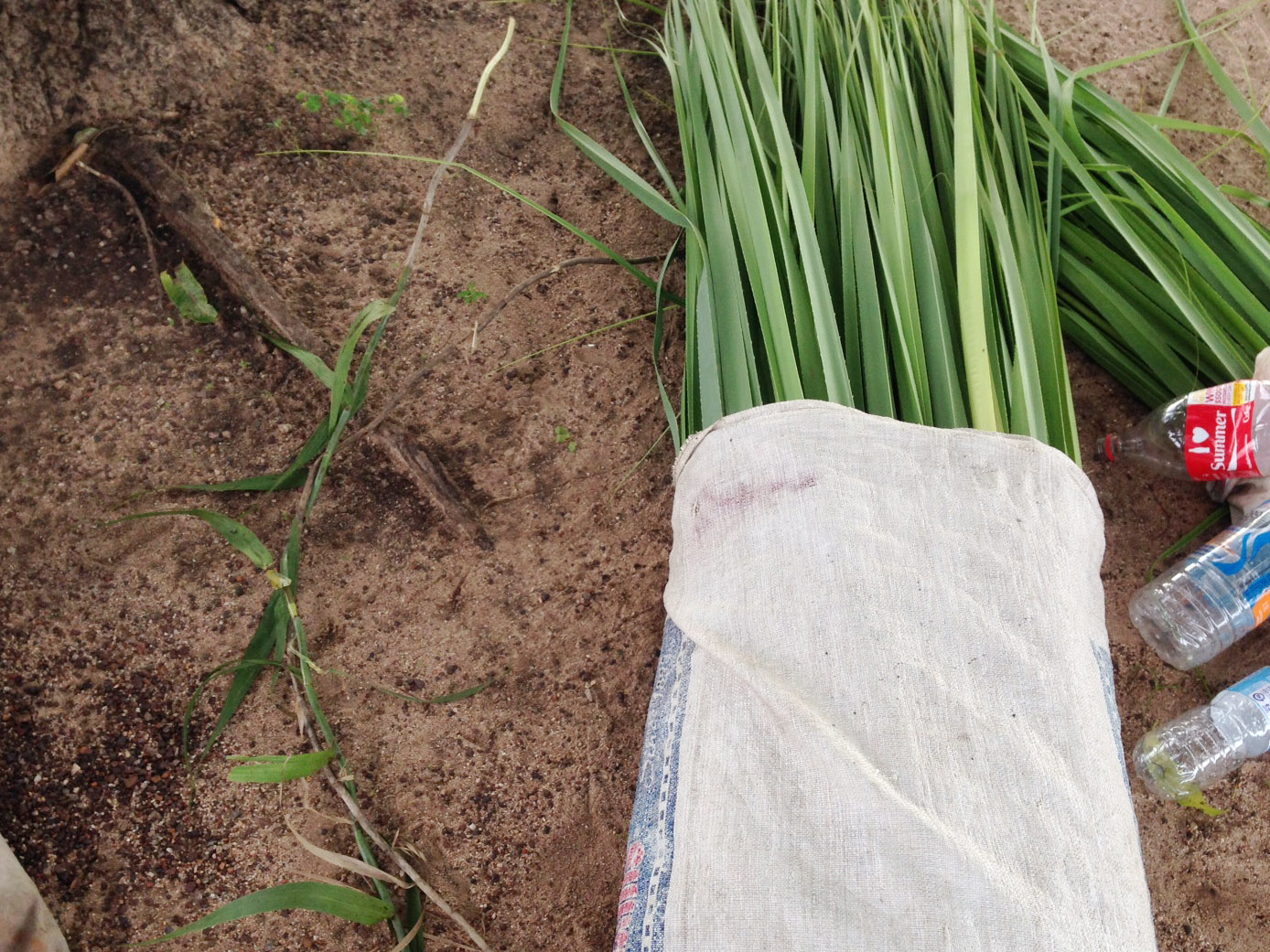
Two important natural materials for Kuninjku fibre art. Flagellaria indica (left) can be used to create strong frames for works, while Pandanus spiralis (right) is used to fill in these frames or independently to create woven works.

The Kuninjku or Kunwinjku people of western and central Arnhem Land developed their own forms of fibre sculpture in the early 2000s, typically flat forms based on a frame of Flagellaria indica or Malaisia scandens vines. This frame, which blocks out the basic shapes, is infilled with a knotted mesh of pandanus fibre, often coloured with various natural local dyes. The invention of this artistic form has been attributed to the artist Marina Murdilnga, who based it on the form of traditional fishing nets which employ a triangular wooden frame infilled with string mesh. Her first work in 2003 represented Yawkyawk, a female water spirit in Kuninjku religion. This subject has remained popular, among other spirit figures, Dreaming stories and animal subjects. Works in this tradition are often made at Maningrida Arts and Culture (MAC) in Maningrida and Injalak Arts in Gunbalanya.

=== Central Desert ===
In 1995 a number of women's centres across the Central Desert were set up with the help of Thisbe Purich, who introduced the women there to basket coiling techniques. As the central body of the coil could be made from local grasses, this required little in the way of infrastructure or imported materials. Only the loose binding for the coils, typically coloured wool or raffia, needed to be bought. This technique spread quickly, and by 2001 the first known sculptural works were produced. These were created by the artist Kantjupayi Benson, and included an emu followed by a dog and set of “camp crockery”. In 2005, the large scale work Tjanpi Grass Toyota won the 22nd National Aboriginal & Torres Strait Islander Art Award. Tjanpi Desert Weavers is the best known art centre working in this tradition.

== See also ==
- Indigenous Australian art
