= Crusoe Kurddal =

Australian actor and sculptor

- Born: 1961
- Died: 2020 (aged 58–59)
- Known for: Aboriginal Australian art
- Parents: Crusoe Kuningbal (father); Lena Kuriniya (mother)
- Relatives: Owen Yalandja (brother), Timothy Wulanjbirr (brother)

Crusoe Kurddal (1960/1961 - 2020) was an Aboriginal Australian artist known for his Mimih and Yawkyawk sculptures, and acting roles.

== Biography ==
Crusoe Kurddal was an artist, dancer, singer, and actor who lived and worked in Maningrida, an aboriginal community in central Arnhem Land of the Northern Territory of Australia. Kurddal's work is known for its inclusion of Mimih figures, and he inherited the right to paint these figures from his late father, Crusoe Kuningbal. Mimih are tall, slender spirits that live in the plateau of Arnhem Land. Kurddal's brother, Owen Yalandja, also inherited the rights to paint Mimih figures, and the two brothers made sculptures of Mimih figures in the vein of their late father's artwork plus sculptures of Yawkyawk figures for ceremonial purpose and for sale. Along with working as a visual artist, Kurddal was also an actor, and he starred in the 2006 film Ten Canoes as Ridjimiraril.

== Artistic career ==
Crusoe Kurddal started his artistic career with Mimih spirits as his primary subject matter. Originally from the Maningrida region of central Arnhem Land, the stories and depictions of the Mimih have been around locally for many years but sculptures are newer. The mimih are spirits from the rock country that are thought to be long, skinny beings that live and move within the cracks of the rocks. Mimih sculptures are usually carved from thin trunks of softwood trees. The body forms have humorous insinuation to them because of many stories. Traditionally Mimih's had traditional rarrk designs, but Kurddal's father utilised small dots and passed it down to his sons.

Later, Crusoe Kurddal switched to sculpting Yawkyawk figures. Yawkyawks are similar to mermaids with the head of a woman and the body of a fish. He carved his sculptures out of wooden poles. Kurrdal made the switch to Yawkyawk figures because he believed they were more easily understood by non-Indigenous viewers as compared to his previous works that depicted sacred ceremonial iconography.

=== Influences ===
Crusoe Kurddal's father, Crusoe Kuningbul, heavily influenced his work. Kuningbul was born in the Middle Liverpool River region, and during WWII he moved to Milingimbi. After the war, he began bark painting at Maningrida, but he finally relocated to Barrihdjowkkeng where he ultimately raised Crusoe and his brothers Owen Yalandja and Tim Wulanibirr. Throughout his prolific career, Kuningbul depicted Mimih spirits through sculptures and in bark paintings. The slim and elongated Mimih spirits live amongst Arnhem Land plateau's rocks. The spirits are said to come out at night through the rock crevices to look after and protect the land. They can mystically appear to hunters in the region to trap them in their rocky realm and magically disappear soon after. Depictions of the Mimih spirits is abundant in the region's rock art, and some say that the Mimih painted the art themselves to reveal their way of life.

Kuningbul was the first and only Maningrida artist to depict Mimih figures in sculptural form from the 1960s to the 1980s, despite the subject being a commonplace in bark paintings from this area. He created these figures from 1968 until his death in 1984. Kuningbul also performed traditional dances and songs, and sometimes, he performed alongside his Mimih sculptures in Kuninjku trade ceremonies called Mamurrng — the sculptures were specifically developed for these ceremonies. Kuningbul's sons talk about their father's carvings by saying that “he made it (carvings) for sale and for shows as well. He used to put it (the carving) in the middle and would dance around it.” Mamurrng ceremonies are traditional ceremonies that celebrate male births. After Kuningbul's death, Kurddal and his brother Owen Yalandja inherited the right to create Mimih sculptures from Kuningbul. His brother, Owen Yalandja, is renowned for his wood carvings and painted designs of Yawkyawk. Yawkyawk was first carved by Yalandja at his country's waterhole in Barridjohwkeng. Yalandja has tested with different carving methods to make a varying array of sizes for the forms—tree sized to trunk and branch sized—and utilizes scaly textures and warps to represent marine and fish features.

Kurddal focused on creating the Mimih spirits and learned to carve these figurines in a similar way to his father, but he subsequently evolved the iconography in his own unique fashion. At first, he continued to take after his father's usage of the red base colour and dot patterning. During the mid 1980s, Kurddal was pushed and inspired to make larger sculptures than his father Crusoe Kuningbal, and now there are currently massive sized Mimih in many public art collections. Many Kuninjku people started to carve comparable models in the late 1980s, but Owen Yalandja and Crusoe Kurddal are the most prominent pioneers in these sculptural depictions. Kurddal's 1985 sculpture entitled Mimih Spirit serves as an example of one of Kurddal's Mimih sculptures that continues in the vein of Kuningbul's artwork. Kurddal began to make Mimih sculptures that are significantly larger in scale than his father's in the mid-1980s.

Later on, he started to work with the natural and organic shapes found in tree trunks to produce pieces that had more curvature such as with Mimih Spirit (2007) and with tree forks to produce "two headed" Mimih, or one spirit perched on top of another. Being a talented dancer, Kurddal aimed to display the trickery and tomfoolery of this spirit in his own physical movements and sculptures by using the same sense of humor in his creations. Through the help of Kurddal's inspiration, the techniques and methods of these figures are now prominent among many Kuninjku artists.

=== Legacy ===
Crusoe Kurddal's father—Crusoe Kuningbal—Kurddal himself, and Owen Yalandja pioneered the creation of Mimih sculptures, but their bodies of work influenced the work of succeeding aboriginal artists. Since the 1980s, other Kuninjku people have been producing sculptures of similar figures because of Kuningbal and, later, his sons; however, Kurddal and Yalandja made the most innovative strides. Now, many Kununjku artist exhibitions showcase a little forest of Mimih, displaying the new diverse painting approaches and styles of the new generation of artists

=== Sales ===
Kurddal is renowned for producing tribal items in addition to working in oils and acrylics. Since 1999, there have been 18 of Kurddal’s pieces put up for auction, of which 11—or 61%—have been purchased. The artist's A Pair of Mimih Spirits, which Deutscher and Hackett sold in March 2010 for $9,000, received the highest price ever recorded. This year, no works have been made available for purchase, and the latest sale we have information on for the artist was in 2021. The Art Gallery of NSW and National Gallery of Victoria both have Crusoe pieces in their collections.

Below is a list of sales generated from Crusoe Kurddal works at auction houses, from 1999 to the present:

- Deutscher and Hackett located in South Yarra VIC, Australia sold 5 works for a value sold of $22,132
- Deutscher~Menzies sold 2 works for a value sold of $11,845
- Bonhams located in Woollahra NSW, Australia sold 1 work for a value sold of $4,880
- Mossgreen Auctions located in Armadale VIC, Australia sold 1 work for a value sold of $3,585
- Shapiro Auctioneers located in Woollahra NSW, Australia sold 1 work for a value sold of $3,360
- Lawsons located in Leichhardt NSW, Australia sold 1 work for a value sold of $2,700

=== Major artworks ===
- Mimih Spirit (2002)
  - Made in Maningrida, this artwork displays the ingenuity of the double figure arrangement which tends to be less common. As for the colouring, Kurddal uses complementary red and black ochre backgrounds for the figures. The sculpture's distinct appearance is a result of the meticulous paint application and precise carving of this piece. The use of contrasting base colours may have been persuaded by his brother Owen Yalandja, who frequently uses a black background on his pieces. The dot patterning comes from the teachings of his father which have been passed down and imparted into Kurddal's work.

== Acting roles ==
Even though Crusoe Kurddal was a master woodcarver, he was also in high demand as an actor in the Australian film business. Without the extensive and brokerage services offered to artists, this type of lifestyle would not be feasible. In 2006, Crusoe Kurddal played the leading role as Ridjimiraril in Rolf de Heer's Ten Canoes. It was the first movie filmed entirely using Australian Aboriginal languages and is a moral tale set in Arnhem Land. Ten Canoes was a critically acclaimed film, winning Best Film at the Australian Film Institute Awards and Un Certain Regard Special Jury Prize at the 2006 Festival de Cannes. Set in Australian Arnhem Land, Ten Canoes narrates a primal adventure story about forbidden love. The narrator gives a story within the story about his ancestors while on a hunt. The narrator describes the great warrior and tribal chief, Ridjimiraril (Crusoe Kurddal), with three wives—one jealous, one clever, and one beautiful. The narrator describes the story as one of Ridjimiraril's wives disappears and Ridjimiraril suspects that a visiting stranger has kidnapped her. He begins on a path of revenge, determined to save his wife. The story continues with all that is to come in his route of vengeance. In addition to Ten Canoes, Crusoe Kurddal has also acted in the movies Australia and Mad Max: Fury Road. He was also a musician who acted and created music for the drama The Sleeping Warrior.

== Collections ==
- Art Gallery of New South Wales
- Gold Coast City Art Gallery
- Museum D'Histoire Naturelle de Lyon, France
- National Gallery of Victoria

== Significant exhibitions ==
- 1996-97: Gamarada. Art Gallery of New South Wales, Sydney, 15 Nov 1996–16 Feb 1997
- 1999-00: Another Country. Art Gallery of New South Wales, Sydney, 04 Jul 1999–02 Apr 2000
- 2004: Crossing Country: The Alchemy of Western Arnhem Land Art. Art Gallery of New South Wales, Sydney, 24 September 2004 – 12 December 2004
- 2008-09: Country Culture Community (2008-09). Art Gallery of New South Wales, Sydney, 12 Nov 2008–19 Apr 2009

== Death ==
Crusoe Kurddal died in 2020.
