= Bob Burruwal =

Aboriginal artist (1952–2021)

- Born: 1952; Bolkdjam, Central Arnhem Land, Northern Territory, Australia
- Died: May 2021 (aged 68-69)
- Known for: Bark painting, Australian Aboriginal fibre sculpture, Contemporary Indigenous Australian art
- Spouse: Lena Yarinkura
- Children: Selina Brian, Yolanda Rostron
- Awards: Wandjuk Marika 3D Memorial Award, Telstra National Aboriginal and Torres Strait Islander Art Award, 1994

Kamarrang Bob Burruwal (1952–2021) was a contemporary Rembarrnga Aboriginal artist from central Arnhem Land in the Northern Territory of Australia. He is best remembered for his bark paintings, carvings, and fibre sculptures, many of which he worked on collaboratively alongside his wife, Lena Yarinkura.

== Biography ==
Burruwal was born in 1952 in Bolkdjam, central Arnhem Land, a region home to the Aboriginal Yolŋu people, in the Northern Territory of Australia. He was of the Dhuwa moiety, Balngarra clan, Kamarrang skin name, Rembarrnga language, and Kunidjangka country.

Growing up, he practiced many Aboriginal Australian art forms creating bark paintings, dancing belts, clap sticks, and didjeridu. While his parents were not artists, he credited his father with teaching him about their cultural stories and way of life which largely influenced his work.

In the 1980s, Burruwal married innovative Indigenous Australian fibre artist and weaver Lena Yarinkura with whom he had two children: Selina Brian (born 1976) and Yolanda Rostron (born 1979). Their shared passion for art was passed down to their children and granddaughter, Philomena Kelly. Yarinkura, who learned traditional skills of basketry and pandanus-weaving from her mother and fellow artist, Lena Djamarrayku (1943-2005), passed on her own ideas and techniques based on these traditions to their daughters as a means of ensuring that her stories and culture would not be forgotten once she is gone. Selina, Yolanda, and Philomena have followed in their parents and grandparents footsteps, creating fibre forms in a similar style to Yarinkura.

The pair usually lived in Yarinkura's mother's country of Bolkdjam, an outstation located about 60 kilometres (37 mi) south of Maningrida. The community of Maningrida is home to Maningrida Arts & Culture, one of the most successful art centres in Australia. Burruwal and Yarinkura were also known to have lived and worked in Ankebarrbirri, Arnhem Land.

Burruwal died in late May 2021.

== Career ==
Throughout his career, Burruwal primarily worked in painting and sculpture, creating traditional works of bark painting and fibre art. Much of the inspiration for his work was drawn from cultural spirits or ancestral beings such as Wayarra and yawkyawk. Figures from everyday life such as camp dogs, feral pigs, and humans were also utilised in his work. With the use of traditional materials such as pandanus and natural ochres to create contemporary forms, Burruwal's sculptures often centred around the theme of blending innovation and tradition as a means of sharing culture.

=== Collaboration ===
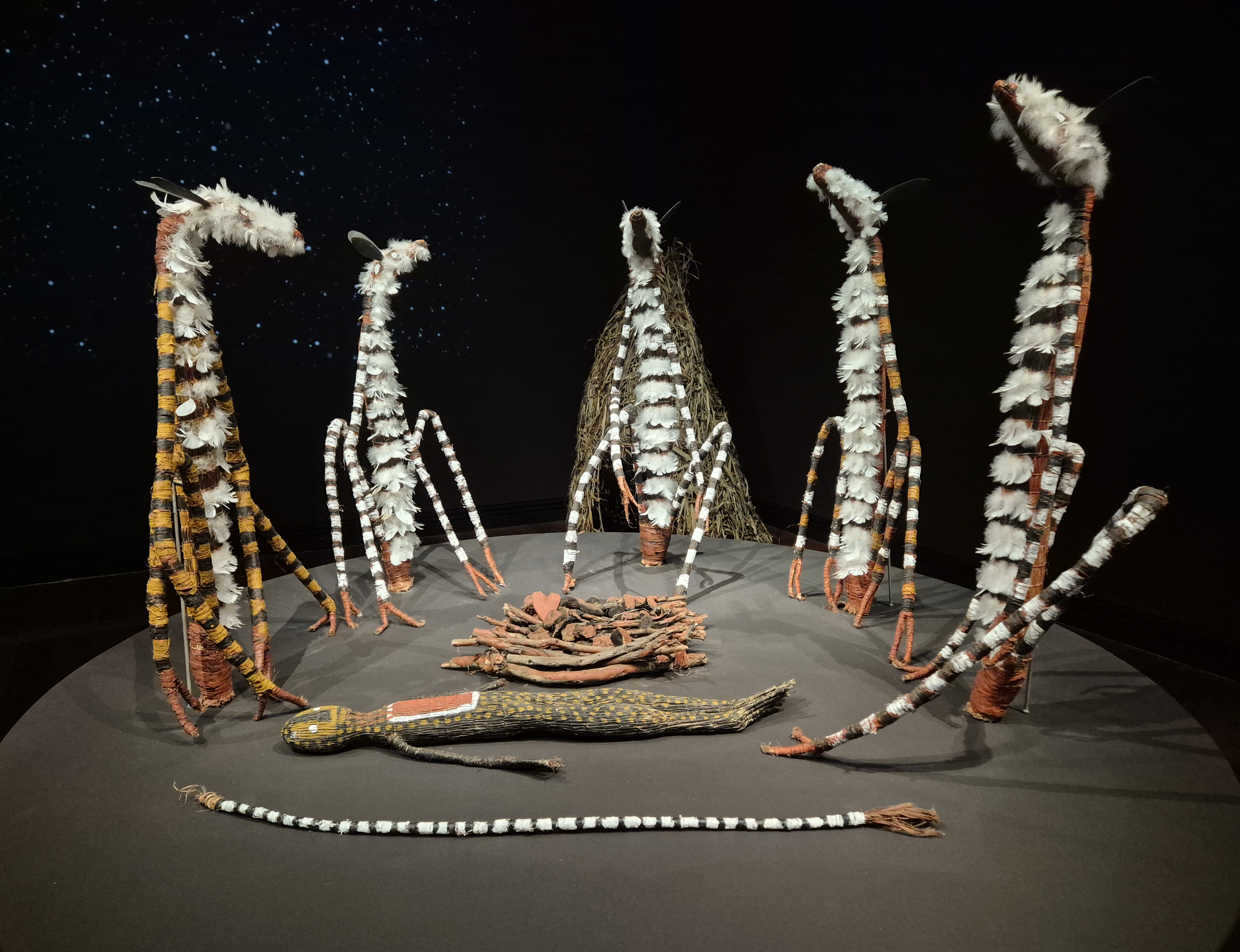
Namorrorddo, group of figures by Lena Yarinkura and Bob Burruwal (2017)

Burruwal collaborated on numerous pieces with his wife, Lena Yarinkura. Though many of these works were made by the both of them, museums and galleries often try to distinguish them from one another, crediting their pieces individually rather than as a collective.

The innovation of Burruwal and Yarinkura's collaborative art making processes similarly extend to their artistic style and practices. Their fibre sculptures represent the transformation of tradition, taking the traditionally utilitarian practice of weaving and fibre arts and using it instead to create aesthetic figurative forms. Though Yarinkura is credited with pioneering the genre of fibre sculpture with these new techniques, Burruwal was likewise influential in their process. His teaching of traditionally male dominated practices in Maningrida such as making and painting barks and hollow-log coffins to Yarinkura allowed her to experiment and hone other areas of craft.

Along with their acclaimed fibre sculptures, Burruwal and Yarinkura also worked with the primarily Western medium of metal-casting, creating unique metal sculptures that incorporate elements of traditional fibre works. These sculptures represent animals or spirits that they either have the rights for representation to in their work or which have a connection to their clan lands. Burruwal's metal sculptures primarily depict echidnas or crocodiles as they are related to his Balngarra clan country. By developing new techniques and using new materials in their sculptures, Burruwal and Yarinkura created a way to represent their traditional culture while still remaining innovative and contemporary enough to be safely viewed by the public.

=== Contemporary Art Market ===
At the age of 30, Burruwal began to make art for the balanda (white non-Aboriginal people) to see and learn about his stories. This innovation of creating work that appeals to the public and the art market is important for contemporary Aboriginal artists as it poses an intersection between tradition and modernity. Burruwal and Yarinkura's work reflects their experience in the art world, having consciously made art for sale since the 1980s and engaging with art directors and curators for several decades. Creating work with this intent became a unique tool for Burruwal and Yarinkura, allowing them room for experimentation and individuality when navigating how to represent their culture without revealing sacred practices.

== Work ==
=== Family Drama, 1994 ===
Family Drama is a collaborative sculpture by Bob Burruwal and Lena Yarinkura. The piece depicts six life-sized paperbark sculptures: a woven family, dog, and burial platform. The figures are styled as mourners with spears, feathers, and dilly bags, referencing the burial or funeral of a family member. Burruwal and Yarinkura were awarded the Wandjuk Marika 3D Memorial Award for Family Drama at 1994 Telstra National Aboriginal and Torres Strait Islander Art Awards.

=== Buya Male, 2016 ===
Buya Male is a three-metre-tall, ornate ceremonial pole decorated with orange, yellow, green, black, and white strings of feathers and twine created by Bob Burruwal in 2016. The piece, known as a Morning Star Pole or Buya Male in Rembarrnga, is an important symbol of the Marradjirri ceremony of Arnhem Land which is used to strengthen relations and social and economic ties between groups.

== Awards ==
Wandjuk Marika 3D Memorial Award - Telstra National Aboriginal and Torres Strait Islander Art Awards, 1994, Lena Yarinkura and Bob Burruwal, Family Drama

== Collections ==
Birriwal's work is held in the collection of the Museum of Contemporary Art Australia, the National Gallery of Victoria among others.
