= Crusoe Kuningbal =

- Born: 1922; Liverpool River Region, Northern Territory, Australia
- Died: 1984 (aged 61–62); Barrihdjowkkeng, Northern Territory, Australia
- Other names: Guningbal, Guninbal, Caruso
- Spouse: Lena Kuriniya
- Children: Crusoe Kurddal (son), Owen Yalandja (son), Timothy Wulandjbirr (son)

Crusoe Kuningbal or Guningbal (1922–1984) was an Aboriginal Australian artist from Maningrida in the Northern Territory, known for a pointillist technique and tall, slim sculptures of mimih spirits. In addition to his art, Kuningbal was a prominent cultural figure in his region, as he sang and performed in ceremonies, most notably that of the Mamurrng.

== Biography ==
Crusoe Kuningbal was born in the middle Liverpool River region in the Northern Territory of Australia as part of the Kuninjku language group.

In his early days, he worked at buffalo shooter camps in West Arnhem Land. Prior to World War II, Kuningbal and other members of the Kuninjku moved to Milingimbi mission. It is likely that he gained inspiration for his art from his time in Milingimbi and later Maningrida. After the war, he returned to Maningrida and began to make bark paintings to sell at the local trading post. He became quite renowned as a bark painter with works being acquired by collections such as the New Gallery of Victoria and the National Gallery of Australia. Most of his bark paintings portray mimih spirits formed by black and white dots. They typically have a solid brown or red background. The small dots align to create stripes that form the bodies of the figures.

Later, Kuningbal relocated to Barrihdjowkkeng, a small outstation where he lived with his wife Lena Kuriniya and sons Crusoe Kurddal, Owen Yalandja, and Timothy Wulandjbirr, all of whom were artists. This outstation was closer to ancestral country, which allowed them to become more in touch with their heritage. Kuningbal had a significant role in the community as a singer, dancer, and storyteller. He began creating mimih figures in the 1960s for the use in ceremonies, particularly the Mamurrng ceremony. In the mid-1960s, Louis Allen became the first Westerner to purchase one of Kuningbal's mimih carvings. After this, the figures began to grow in popularity. In 1984, the year of Kuningbal's death, the National Gallery of Australia acquired some of his mimih figures. He passed down his artistic skills and techniques to his sons, Crusoe Kurddal and Owen Yalandja. Lena Kuriniya, his wife, was also a successful artist, and her works were featured in some of the same exhibitions as her husband's. In 1999, Lena was the top-earning Kuninjku sculptor.

Crusoe Kuningbal is widely recognized as the first artist in the region to carve mimih spirit figures in three-dimensional sculptures, a practice he began in the 1960s. His carvings portrayed the spirits as tall, slender beings associated with the rocky escarpments of Arnhem Land. According to Kuninjku belief, mimih live within rock fissures and emerge at dusk. They are known to be elusive hunters into the rock country and vanishing without a trace. Contemporary people say that the mimih painted much of the rock art that displays their images and lifestyle. Kuningbal's innovation laid the groundwork for a new sculptural tradition within the Kuninjku community.

Kuningbal also played a foundational role as a cultural innovator. He was the first artist to carve mimih spirit figures for ceremonial use, and this practice has since evolved into a key artistic tradition in Western Arnhem Land. His work contributed to what is now a thriving local industry, enabling artists to earn income while preserving cultural practices on their ancestral lands.

== Mamurrng ==
The Mamurrng is a ceremony in which two communities with different language backgrounds come together for trade and diplomacy. This ceremony includes songs, dances, beating of clapsticks, and playing of the didjeridu. Red and white ochre is used to paint the bodies of participants and special cloth outfits and headbands are worn. In the 1960s, Kuningbal pioneered many songs and dances for the ceremony that were inspired by the mimih spirits. Kunginbal created the first mimih sculptures used for the ceremony, where they were placed in the middle to be danced around. These statues broke tradition by covering them in his trademark dots instead of traditional rarrk designs. Kunginbal's contributions were quickly popularized within his local setting. This ceremony was performed in public spaces in Maningrida where community members and outsiders noticed Kuningbal's work, resulting in a market demand for the sculptures.

== Works ==
Crusoe Kuningbal was a dancer, singer, painter and carver. He is known for creating ceremonial dance and songs as well as bark paintings of spirits. His bark paintings did not do well in the market, so few were produced. In his region, Kuningbal was the first artist to produce sculptures for inclusion in local trade ceremony. He was also the first artist to put his works for sale at the newly opened art centre in the 1960s. His sculptures are each titled Mimih Spirit. They stand at a range of heights depending on the single piece of wood that is used to carve the figures, ranging between 114-184.5 cm and a diameter of their cylindrical bodies of 12-16.5 cm. Kuningbal only used Brachychiton diversifolius trees, more commonly known as northern kurrajong. Artists from the Kuninjku/Kunibeidji language cluster continue to use this tree species for their carvings, with many language groups in the region using the same medium. His earliest sculptures of mimih were smaller and less detailed than his later works, being no taller than 1m, and the arms were depicted with grooves. Later pieces made follow a general pattern and aesthetic with the tree carved to have two short, thin legs at the base. The torso is carved to be long, thin, and sometimes curved according to the natural growth of the tree. The arms are carved at the base of the head and along the length of the torso. The head is cylindrical with a sometimes slight conical shape. Using natural pigments, large black circles are painted for eyes with a line of black below for a mouth. Dots in other natural pigment colours are then painted in flowing lines on the figure down the face, the arms, most plentifully on the torso, and partially down the legs. These sculptures are left unsigned. His sculptures were relatively smaller and less detailed than the ones his two sons, Owen and Crusoe, would go on to create after his death.

=== Materials and technique ===
Kuningbal worked with Brachychiton diversifolius, a tree prized for its durability and resistance to cracking. This choice shaped the material preferences of later Juninjku carvers, including his sons.

The wood used for mimih sculptures often reflects linguistic and cultural traditions. Kuninjku artists predominantly use Brachychiton diversifolius, a tree species associated with their regional artistic lineage, while neighboring language groups favor Bombax ceiba. This divergence does not stem from availability but from cultural traditions introduced by early artists like Kuningbal and adapted by each community.

Brachychiton diversifolius was initially for ceremonial exchange and later for sale through the emerging Aboriginal art market. Kuningbal’s unique approach helped establish mimih carving as a distinct and recognizable genre, shaping future generations.

Kuninjku artists, including Crusoe Kuningbal and his descendants, emphasize the importance of rarrk, or cross hatching, in both aesthetic and cultural terms. Paintings are described as rarrk-mak, when finely and carefully executed, or kabimbebme (shining paint) when the colors are so vibrant that they appear to jump out at the viewer.

== Career ==
Crusoe Kunigbal began as an artist through bark painting as well as in ceremonial song and dance. In the 1960s Kuningbal began to create carved statues and started the tradition of carving in his region. Crusoe Kuningbal primarily focused his artwork on portraying the mimih, tall, thin, fragile spirit beings that inhabit the rocky areas of Arnhem Land and act in mischievous ways. These spirits are thought to be able to leave their realm through cracks in the rock in order to visit the world of humans. In the beginning of his career as a sculptor of mimih spirits in the 1980s, they sold from $12-$50. Kuningbal went on to produce his mimih spirit sculptures for sale at the Maningrida Art Center in the Northern Territory of Australia. Peter Cooke, the arts advisor in Maningrida, had a large influence in the marketing of Kunigbal's works. During his time, Cooke developed a strong relationships with Kuninjku artists and was bestowed a classificatory relation to a Kuninjku clan. Kuningbal was successful in his local market, but his sons brought sculptures of mimih to a larger, cross-cultural market. Many museums and galleries would later collect his pieces, as well as his sons'.

Kuningbal was an innovator and he frequently added new elements to traditional art practices of the region. He was the first person in his clan to create life-size carvings of the mimih. He strayed from the rarrk designs that are typical of his region, covering the mimih sculptures with small dots instead. Typically, he would paint his sculptures with a red ground and decorate them with rows of white dots. These small and plentiful dots became his trademark. He would later pass this style and techniques onto his sons Crusoe Kurddal and Owen Yalandja. They would both go on to become notable artists themselves, innovating on the mimih sculptures by making them bigger, more detailed, and with smaller, more plentiful dots. They also branched out to include painted backgrounds and sculpting of other cultural and ancestral figures. There are dozens of people in Maningrida who took up carving mimih sculptures after Kuningbal passed, including some women who are historically excluded from art practices in the region.

His work is included in the Aboriginal and Torres Strait Islander Affairs Art (ATSIAA) Collection at the National Museum Australia. This collection holds 2,050 works spanning a 38 year period following a 1967 referendum that dramatically changed the governance in regards to Aboriginal Australians. The ATSIAA collection stands as a visual history of the diversity and development that took place in Aboriginal Art during this shift in governance. In 1983, Elwyn Lynn commissioned Kuningbal to create a mimih figure spirit for the J.W. Power Collection of contemporary art at the University of Sydney and the Museum of Contemporary Art Australia. This would be the first work of Aboriginal Australian art to enter the Power Collection.

== Legacy ==
Kuningbal's artistic legacy continues through the work of his sons, Owen and Crusoe, both of whom have become leading sculptures in the region. His sons' continue to carve mimih statues that can reach up to four meters high. His stylistic carving innovations have been adopted and expanded by a younger generation of Kuninjku artists.

His son, Crusoe Kurddal, adapted his father's mimih carving tradition for broader commercial and exhibition audiences. This intergenerational transition is described as central to the continued success of Kuninjku sculptural arts. Kurddal is also known to be a proficient dancer and uses his physical movements to capture the antics of the mimih spirits. Owen Yalandja, his other son, is known to perform songs that have been passed down from his father. Once a song man has died, their songs can only be sung by their sons. Both Kurddal and Yalandja are known to be leaders in innovation in sculpture.

Over half of Kuninjku artists surveyed in the early 2000s, including Kuningbal's sons, cited his influence as the reason they continue to work with B. diversifolius and focus on mimih figures.

Kuningbal’s legacy lives not only through his sons but also through a broader kin network of painters who developed distinctive regional styles at outstations like Mumeka and Milmilngkan. These localized “schools” of bark painting reflect a combination of inherited techniques and personal innovation.

== Collections ==
- Art Gallery of New South Wales
- National Gallery of Victoria
- J.W. Power Collection at the Museum of Contemporary Art, Sydney
- National Gallery of Australia
- Aboriginal and Torres Strait Islander Affairs Art Collection at the National Museum Australia
- Art Gallery of South Australia

== Significant exhibitions ==
- 1993-4: Aratjara: Art of the First Australians. Europe, 1993-1994. Kunstsammlung Nordrhein-Westfalen, Dusseldorf, Germany; Hayward Gallery, London, England; and the Louisiana Museum of Modern Art, Humlebæk, Denmark.
- 2004: Crossing Country: The Alchemy of Western Arnhem Land Art. Art Gallery of New South Wales, Sydney, 25 September - 12 December 2004.
- 2012-2013: In the Red; On the Vibrancy of Things. UQ Anthropology Museum, Queensland, June 2012 - January 2013.
- 2018: Outstation. Outstation Gallery and Maningrida Arts & Culture, Maningrida, 4–29 May 2018.
