= Owen Yalandja =

Aboriginal Australian carver and painter

- Born: December 31, 1961 (age 64); Maningrida
- Known for: Aboriginal art, Australian art, bark painting
- Children: Dustin Bonson (son)
- Parent(s): Crusoe Kuningbal (father), Lena Kuriniya (mother)
- Relatives: Crusoe Kurddal (brother), Timothy Wulanjbirr (brother)

Owen Yalandja (born 1961) is Aboriginal Australian carver, painter and singer of the Kuninjku people from western Arnhem Land, Australia. A senior member of the Dangkorlo clan, who are the Indigenous custodians of an important site related to female water spirits known as yawkyawk, Yalandja has become internationally renowned for his painted carvings of these spirits, as well as his paintings on eucalyptus bark.

== Biography ==
Born in 1961, Owen Yalandja belongs to the Kuninjku people within Maningrida (Northern Territory of Central Arnhem Land). He is now a senior member of the Dangkorlo clan, which means that he has the responsibility to be custodians of a yawkyawk site (Yirridjdja moiety) in the Mirrayar billabong. Yawkyawk are female water spirits, similar to the Western mermaids. However, they are more than a mystical creature; to the Kuninjku people, yawkyawks are manifestations of their young female ancestors. These female water spirits can be disturbed or frightened by humans, causing them to retreat or escape into the Mirrayar billabong, Yalandja's custodian site. The Mirrayar billabong is sacred to the Yirritja moiety and the Dangkorlo clan are custodians to the billabong.

Owen Yalandja was known for his singing at the yawkyawk ceremonies, as well as his carved representations of the yawkyawk spirits. Yalandja learned the foundations of his carving techniques from his father, Crusoe Kuningbal. It wasn't until Crusoe Kuningbal's death that Yalandja began to begin carving mimihs spirits.

Kuningbal was a renowned ceremonial leader, bark painter, and carver. Crusoe Kuningbal was the yawkyawk ceremony leader. In the 1960s, Kuningbal began experimenting and inventing new ways to carving and sculpt mimih spirits. Until the 1980s, Kuningbal was the only Maningrida artist who could carve the mimih spirits. His artwork held ceremonial and sacred meanings, and they were used in a public Kuninjky ceremony called Mamurrng. It is Aboriginal tradition that an artist like Kuningbal will teach the next generation of male artists how to produce similar artwork and the meaning behind it; Yalandja and his brother, Cruose Kurddal, both learned from their father the skills and techniques needed to make these kinds of figures. It wasn't until after Kuningbal's death in 1984 that Yalandja and Kurddal began making large figure carvings themselves. Kurddal's style remained similar to his fathers, using the same red painted background and dot pattern. Kuningbal's original style can be seen replicated in Kurddal's Mimih spirit (1985), shown in the Art Gallery of New South Wales. Yalandja, on the other hand, began experimenting and expanding beyond his father's teachings; he created new styles, techniques, and content.

Yalandja and Kurddal became successful artists, continuing the legacy of his fathers' artwork and tradition. Kuningbal inspired many Kuninjku people to create similar artwork, but it was Yalandja and Kurddal that led the way in creating mimih and yawkyawk pieces that were new and innovative. Due to their influence and skill, this form of artwork has become one of the most recognizable styles to come from Central Arnhem Land.

Since 2014, Yalandja has lived at the Barrihdjowkkeng outstation which was established by his father, close to the yawkyawk site.

== Career ==
Instead of the more traditional forms of depicting the yawkyawks (such as bark paintings), Yalandja focused his career on creating large, three-dimensional wood carvings that represent these spirits. The spirits of the yawkyawks were girls from ancestral time, but they have since been transformed into slender water spirits with forked fish-tails, undulating bodies, scales, pointed breasts, and long, featureless faces. According to Yalandja:

"Yawkyawk is a bit the equivalent of a mermaid in balanda culture. Yawkyawk is my Dreaming and she lives in the water at Barrihdjowkkeng near where I have set up my outstation. She has always been there. I often visit this place."

While greatly inspired by his father's technique, Yalandja and his brother made the carvings larger to better represent the spirits. Within his collection at the Art Gallery in New South Wales, Yalandja's figures range from 227 cm to 285 cm (7.5 ft to 9.3 ft). Another defining feature of the yawkyawk is the scales; in order to depict these scales, Yalandja would paint the scales in arc-like shapes. For example, this technique can be seen used in combination with his father's classic dot technique in one of his 2001 Yawkyawk pieces, as seen in the Art Gallery of New South Wales. In 1990, he introduced a new 'V'-like technique to better indicate the yawkyawk's individual scales, giving the figure a more watery, "scaly sheen." This technique can be seen in his 1999 Yawkyawk figure, also shown in the Art Gallery of New South Wales. Yalandja recalls learning from his father the dot decoration technique for scales, but he says he likes to make the yawkyawk figures "according to [his] own individual ideas... this style is [his] own, no one else does them like this." Yalandja's innovative design helps to show the spiritual power of these figures, in a similar manner to the way the traditional rarrk (cross-hatching) style of bark art was meant to do.

Another example of Yalandja's innovation is his frequently-used black-coloured background. His father was known for a red painted background, and while some of Yalandja's figures use this background colour(such as the 2001 Yawkyawk), he is well-known for his black background figures (such as his 1999 Yawkyawk pieces). Both the red and black paint are created from natural earth pigments, but the black is more unique whereas the red is more traditional. When looking at the black background figures, they appear richer, with the scale features more clearly contrasted. The increased size, new scale techniques, and black backgrounds are all examples of Yalandja's artistic innovation and creativity.

One aspect of Yalandja's Yawkyawk figures that is particularly unique is the shape of the figures. He is known to specialize in thin, waving, and large structures, making the figure appear sensuous and beautiful. Yalandja captures the spirits' slender, undulating bodies of by selecting pieces of curved wood that show a sense of movement. It is very unusual for Aboriginal pieces to have this sensual aesthetic; however, it is an important characteristic of the yawkyawks, as they represent fertility and are known to show off their elongated bodies and long-hair in their occasional sunbathing sightings. Additionally, the movement in the wood helps to depicting how she may look while swimming. This unusual innovation helps Yalandja to create a more realistic representation of the yawkyawk figure.

The wood for these carvings can only come from the kurrajong tree (Brachychiton diversifolius), which was the same kind of wood his father would use for his mimih carvings. This wood is strong across the grain, which helps prevent any splitting that may occur while Yalandja is carving the spirit's shape and features Sometimes, this wood would even provide a natural split, perfect to use for the yawkyawk's characteristic forked tail.

While he is best known for his carvings on the kurrajob tree, Yalandja has also painted yawkyawks on eucalyptus barks and hollow-log coffins (known as lorrkkon). Lorrkkon hold human skeletal remains, not the entire body, and are made for both commercial art reasons as well as ceremonial reasons. When made for the art market, the artist is able to choose what to paint on the hollow-logs, making them more like painted sculptures, carvings, or three-dimensional bark art. Yalandja created lorrkkon for art market, painting the log with the same technique he created for the scales of the yawkyawks. This pattern itself does not hold sacred meaning, thus is it considered "outside" and "non-representational; however, any clan member or person with knowledge of Kuninjku customs will understand that this design represents the scales of the yawkyawk spirit. One example of this kind of lorrkkin is his Ndalkodjek Yawkyawk made in 2017 (157.5 cm).

Yalandja's work is held in most significant Australian collections as well as the British Museum, the Hood Museum and the Kluge-Ruhe Aboriginal Art Collection of the University of Virginia. In 2009 he was selected for the inaugural National Indigenous Art Triennial at the National Gallery of Australia, and he is a five-time finalist in the National Aboriginal and Torres Strait Islander Art Awards.

Yalandja won the Bark Painting Award at the 2023 NATSIAA awards.

== Art style ==
Many people think of Aboriginal art as only dot paintings or bark painting. Owen Yalandja changes this narrative through his carving techniques and sculpture making skills. When Yalandja's father died he truly began his artistic journey. Yalandja started experimenting with the painted designs and use of colour and, while his brother Kurddal continued carving mimih, Yalandja began carving yawk yawk. While Paddy Compass Namatbara displayed yawk yawk through painting Owen yalandja took the approach of representing yawk yawk through sculpture. He would carve their bodies like those of the mimih – tall, very slender and often with intricate detail over their sometimes twisted bodies. Today, however, his yawkyawk sculptures are more distinct and refined from his mimih figures. Mimih's are said to be figures that live inside the rocks of Arnhem Land and come out at dusk through gaps in the rock. They can make themselves invisible to humans or magically appear to lure and trap hunters inside their rocky world.

Owen Yalandja states, "My father... taught me and my brother... how to carve. He only did mimih spirit figures and when I first started as an artist I used to make mimih figures as well. Then, I decided to change and to start representing yawkyawk spirit figures."

Their sculptures and artwork were similar to their fathers, but they made the figures much larger to best represent the size and form of mimih spirits. Yalandja shows displays his style changing through this quote, "I love making these sculptures and I have invented a way to represent the fish scales on her body. The colors I use have particular meanings [which are not public]. I make them either red or black. I am now teaching my kids to carve, just like my father did for us. I make it [yawkyawk] according to my individual ideas... My father used to decorate them with dots. A long time ago, he showed me how to do this. But this style is my own; no one else does them like this."

Over time, Yalandja's art style changed, and the things that he decides to represent change along with it. When Yalandja creates his sculptures he only uses kurrajong wood. This is the same wood his father used. Along with that, he uses natural pigments from ochre to create beautiful designs on his figures. When choosing specific bark to use, he selects tree trunks that are thin and contains curved lines. This allows for the figures he paints to be wavy in appearance and create the impression of movement in the body and tail. The split at the top of the trunk often allows for a good piece of bark to make the yawkyawk's tail. Along with his style changing over time, he has had his work displayed in Western museums and culture. This also allowed for his style to shift and he states, "We can't cut the trees in the city because there are new laws now ... . What we can do is join the rest of the other mainstream artists, what materials they use," he said. "But then we as indigenous people use our traditional stories or interpretations and put it into that new art form, the new medium we taste in the cities." Although Yalandja's style might shift and change over time, his roots are still connected to aboriginal tradition and the traditions of his father and the Dangkorlo clan. He is using a different medium than a lot of other aboriginal artists and that sets him apart. The use of sculptures is different from others and he stands out for it.

"Yawkyawk" is a famous piece by Owen Yalandja that demonstrates his art style. This piece is a sculpture that is currently held at The British Museum. It was made in 2011 and is made out of natural pigments and kurrajong wood. Similar to a lot of other pieces the background is black. This is different from his father, which shows his personal style. It was made in Manigrida and is 107 x 11.5 cm. The piece displays his carving abilities through the small carving he makes on the body of the Yawk Yawk. It also shows the precision of his carving with the detail he puts on the ends of the tail. He is well known for his use of dots and he represents the dots on the body of the Yawk Yawk. Along with incorporating dots, similar to how his father did, he uses his own techniques of making very small carvings on the body of the yawk yawk to represent the scales on the body. While Yalandja is seen as the leader in innovation in this style, these techniques of carving are shared amongst the Kuninjku artists.

== Collections ==
- Art Gallery of New South Wales
- Art Gallery of South Australia
- Australian Museum, Sydney
- The British Museum
- Hood Museum of Art, Dartmouth College
- Kluge-Ruhe Aboriginal Art Collection of the University of Virginia
- Museum and Art Gallery of the Northern Territory
- National Gallery of Victoria
- Queensland Art Gallery
- National Gallery of Australia
- Australian Museum, Sydney
- Musée des Confluences, Lyon, France

== Significant exhibitions ==
- 2000: Biennale of Sydney. Art Gallery of New South Wales, Sydney, 26 May – 30 July 2000.
- 2001: Outside in: Research Engagements with Arnhem Land Art, Drill Hall Gallery, Australian National University, Canberra, 30 August - 7 October 2001.
- 2004: Crossing Country: The Alchemy of Western Arnhem Land Art. Art Gallery of New South Wales, Sydney, 25 September - 12 December 2004.
- 2007: One sun, One moon: Aboriginal Art in Australia. Art Gallery of New South Wales, Sydney, 03 Jul 2007–02 Dec 2007
- 2007-2009: Culture Warriors: The Australian Indigenous Art Triennial. National Gallery of Australia, Canberra, 13 October 2007 – 10 February 2008; American University Museum, Katzen Arts Center, Washington, D.C., 10 September – 8 December 2009.
- Crossing Cultures: The Owen and Wagner Collection of Contemporary Aboriginal Australian Art. Hood Museum of Art, Dartmouth College, Hanover, NH, September 15, 2012 – March 10, 2013; Toledo Museum of Art, Toledo, OH, April 11–July 14, 2013.
- 2016-17: Sentient Lands. Art Gallery of New South Wales, Sydney, 4 Jun 2016 – 8 Oct 2017.
- 2019-2020: The Inside World: Contemporary Aboriginal Australian Memorial Poles. Nevada Museum of Art, Reno, NV; Charles H. Wright Museum of African American History, Detroit, MI; The Fralin Museum of Art, University of Virginia, Charlottesville, VA; Frost Art Museum, Florida International University, Miami, FL.
