= Ten Canoes =

2006 Australian documentation film

- Promotional movie poster for the film
- Directed by: Rolf de Heer; Peter Djigirr
- Written by: Rolf de Heer
- Produced by: Rolf de Heer; Julie Ryan
- Starring: Jamie Gulpilil
- Narrated by: David Gulpilil
- Cinematography: Ian Jones
- Edited by: Tania Nehme
- Distributed by: Palace Films and Cinemas
- Release date: 29 June 2006
- Running time: 92 minutes
- Country: Australia
- Languages: Yolngu Matha; English
- Budget: A$2,200,000
- Box office: A$3,511,649

Ten Canoes is a 2006 Australian historical drama/docudrama film directed by Rolf de Heer and Peter Djigirr and starring Crusoe Kurddal. The film is set in Arnhem Land in northern Australia, before Western influence, and tells the story of a group of ten men doing traditional hunting in canoes. A narrator tells the story, and the overall format is that of a moral tale.

It was Australia's submission to the 79th Academy Awards for the Academy Award for Best Foreign Language Film, but was not accepted as a nominee.

== Synopsis ==
The film is set in Arnhem Land, in a time separate of Western influence, and tells the story of a group of ten men in a traditional hunting context. The leader of the group, Minygululu, tells the young Dayindi (Jamie Gulpilil) a story about another young man even further back in time who, like Dayindi, coveted his elder brother's youngest wife. The sequences featuring Dayindi and the hunt are in black and white, while shots set in distant past are in colour. All protagonists speak in indigenous languages of the Yolŋu Matha language group, with subtitles. The film is narrated in English by David Gulpilil, although versions of the film without narration, and featuring narration in Yolŋu Matha, are also available.

Minygululu tells a story of the warrior Ridjimiraril, who suspects a visiting stranger of kidnapping his second wife. In a case of mistaken identity, Ridjimiraril kills a member of a neighbouring tribe. To prevent all-out war, tribal laws dictate that the offending tribe allow the offender to be speared from a distance by individuals of the tribe of the slain man. The offender is allowed to be accompanied by a companion, and in this instance he takes his younger brother, Yeeralparil. Whenever one of the two is hit, the spear-throwers will stop, and justice will have been served. Ridjimiraril is hit and mortally wounded but survives long enough to return to his camp, where he is tended to by his eldest wife. When he knows he is dying he performs a ritual dance and once dead his hair is cut and his body is painted to enable the ancestral spirits to guide him to the next world.

The elder brother's kidnapped second wife then finds her way back to the camp. She reveals that she had been kidnapped by a different tribe, much farther away and had taken this long to return. She mourns her lost husband, who had attacked the wrong tribe, though now she and the elder wife take his younger brother as their new husband. The younger brother, who was only interested in the youngest of the three wives, now has to care for all of them, and satisfying their many demands is clearly going to be much more than he wished.

Minygululu tells this story in the hope that Dayindi learns of the added responsibilities of a husband and elder statesman in the tribe, and in the end we see Dayindi withdrawing from his pursuit of Minygululu's young wife.

== Cast ==
The actors and actresses, mostly from Ramingining in East Arnhem Land, speak various dialects of the Yolngu Matha language family. Crusoe Kurddal is from Maningrida and speaks Kuninjku.

- Crusoe Kurddal – Ridjimiraril
- Jamie Gulpilil – Dayindi/Yeeralparil
- Richard Birrinbirrin – Birrinbirrin
- Peter Minygululu – Minygululu
- Frances Djulibing – Nowalingu
- David Gulpilil – The Storyteller
- Sonia Djarrabalminym – Banalandju
- Cassandra Malangarri Baker – Munandjarra
- Philip Gudthaykudthay (of Bula'Bula Arts) – The Sorcerer
- Peter Djigirr – Canoeist/The Victim/Warrior
- Michael Dawu – Canoeist/The Stranger
- Bobby Bunungurr – Canoeist/Uncle
- Johnny Buniyira – Canoeist/Warrior
- Gil Birmingham – Canoeist/Warrior
- Steven Wilinydjanu Maliburr – Canoeist/Warrior

== Production ==
The title of the film arose from discussions between de Heer and David Gulpilil about a photograph of ten canoeists poling across the Arafura Swamp, taken by anthropologist Donald Thomson in 1936.

It is the first ever movie entirely filmed in Australian Aboriginal languages. The film is partly in colour and partly in black and white, in docudrama style largely with a narrator explaining the story.

=== Locations ===
- Arafura Swamp, Northern Territory, Australia
- Arnhem Land, Northern Territory
- Ramingining, Northern Territory

== Release ==
Ten Canoes was released on 29 June 2006.

== Reception ==
=== Box office ===
At the end of 2006, the film stood as one of the highest grossing Australian films of that year. By October it had made just over $3,000,000 from a budget of $2,200,000.

Ten Canoes grossed A$3,511,649 at the box office in Australia.

=== Critical response ===
Ten Canoes has an approval rating of 98% on review aggregator website Rotten Tomatoes, based on 66 reviews, and an average rating of 7.8/10. The website's critical consensus states: "Ten Canoes combines adventure, comedy, and anthropology to explore an Aborigine folk tale both fallibly human and legendary. Helmer Rolf de Heer depicts a barely represented oral tradition with a clean style". Metacritic assigned the film a weighted average score of 82 out of 100, based on 20 critics, indicating "universal acclaim".

=== Accolades ===
Ten Canoes won the Un Certain Regard Special Jury Prize at the 2006 Cannes Film Festival. De Heer rejected claims he is a white director making an Indigenous story: "People talk about, what is a white director doing making an Indigenous story? They're [i.e. the Indigenous actors are] telling the story, largely, and I'm the mechanism by which they can." Ten Canoes was screened at the Sydney Film Festival in June 2006 and was released nationally on 29 June 2006.

In October 2006 Ten Canoes was chosen as Australia's official entry into the Best Foreign Language Film category for the 2007 Academy Awards, thus becoming the third Australian film to be considered for the award (following Floating Life in 1996 and La Spagnola in 2001).

Ten Canoes was nominated for seven Australian Film Institute (AFI) Awards, of which it won six. The movie won the awards for Best Picture (Julie Ryan, Rolf de Heer producers), Best Director (Rolf de Heer and Peter Djigirr), Best Screenplay - Original (Rolf de Heer), Best Cinematography (Ian Jones), Best Editing (Tania Nehme), and Best Sound (James Currie, Tom Heuzenroeder, Michael Bakaloff, and Rory McGregor). It was also nominated for Best Production Design (Beverly Freeman).

It won three awards from the Film Critics Circle of Australia: Best Film, Best Editing (Tania Nehme), and Best Cinematography (Ian Jones). (The latter award was a tie with David Williamson's work on Jindabyne.) The film was also nominated for Best Director and Best Original Screenplay. The Balanda and the Bark Canoes, a documentary that aired on Australian network SBS and which detailed de Heer's experiences making the film, won Best Australian Short Documentary for de Heer, Tania Nehme, and Molly Reynolds. The documentary explores the interplay between cultures in a film project immersing a balanda (white man) into the intricacies of kinship systems impacting the casting of the film as well as giving some voice to the inner conflicts of indigenous peoples today caught between the world of their heritage and that of modern life. This aspect has been explored by academic D. Bruno Starrs with regard to the "authentic Aboriginal voice".

The film received the Grand Prix for Best Film at Film Fest Gent in 2006.

The film ranked #72 in Empire magazine's "The 100 Best Films of World Cinema" in 2010.

=== Awards ===
Award	Category	Subject	Result
AACTA Awards (2006 AFI Awards)	Best Film	Julie Ryan, Rolf de Heer	Won
AACTA Awards (2006 AFI Awards)	Best Direction	Peter Djigirr, Rolf de Heer	Won
AACTA Awards (2006 AFI Awards)	Best Original Screenplay	Rolf de Heer	Won
AACTA Awards (2006 AFI Awards)	Best Cinematography	Ian Jones	Won
AACTA Awards (2006 AFI Awards)	Best Editing	Tania Nehme	Won
AACTA Awards (2006 AFI Awards)	Best Sound	Michael Bakaloff, James Currie, Tom Heuzenroeder, Rory McGregor	Won
AACTA Awards (2006 AFI Awards)	Best Production Design	Beverley Freeman	Nominated
Cannes Film Festival	Un Certain Regard - Special Jury Prize	Rolf de Heer	Won
FCCA Awards	Best Film	Rolf de Heer	Won
FCCA Awards	Best Film	Julie Ryan	Won
FCCA Awards	Best Director	Peter Djigirr	Nominated
FCCA Awards	Best Director	Rolf de Heer	Nominated
FCCA Awards	Best Original Screenplay	Rolf de Heer	Nominated
FCCA Awards	Best Editing	Tania Nehme	Won
FCCA Awards	Best Cinematography	Ian Jones	Won
Film Fest Gent	Grand Prix	Peter Djigirr	Won
Film Fest Gent	Grand Prix	Rolf de Heer	Won
Inside Film Awards	Best Feature Film	Julie Ryan	Nominated
Inside Film Awards	Best Feature Film	Rolf de Heer	Nominated
Inside Film Awards	Best Director	Rolf de Heer	Won
Inside Film Awards	Best Director	Peter Djigirr	Won
Inside Film Awards	Best Script	Rolf de Heer	Nominated
Inside Film Awards	Best Actor	Crusoe Kurddal	Won
Inside Film Awards	Best Cinematography	Ian Jones	Won
Inside Film Awards	Best Sound	Michael Bakaloff	Won
Inside Film Awards	Best Sound	James Currie	Won
Inside Film Awards	Best Sound	Tom Heuzenroeder	Won
Inside Film Awards	Best Sound	Rory McGregor	Won
Mar del Plata International Film Festival	Best Film	Rolf de Heer	Nominated
Mar del Plata International Film Festival	Best Film	Peter Djigirr	Nominated
NatFilm Festival	Audience Award	Peter Djigirr	Won
NatFilm Festival	Audience Award	Rolf de Heer	Won
Satellite Award	Best Foreign Language Film		Nominated

== Twelve Canoes ==
After Ten Canoes sparked worldwide interest in Yolngu culture, a spin-off educational project known as Twelve Canoes was born, in collaboration with the people at Ramingining. A website, videos and study guide were created, focussing on twelve key subjects. The film of the twelve segments was shown on SBS TV in Australia, and has been available online. The DVD was released in 2009, and as of 2024 the website continues to be available.

== See also ==
- Cinema of Australia
- South Australian Film Corporation
- Atanarjuat: The Fast Runner, a 2001 Canadian film entirely in Inuktitut by Inuit actors, also about an ancestral aboriginal legend also involving the sexual jealousy of brothers.
- List of submissions to the 79th Academy Awards for Best Foreign Language Film
- List of Australian submissions for the Academy Award for Best Foreign Language Film
