= Lena Yarinkura =

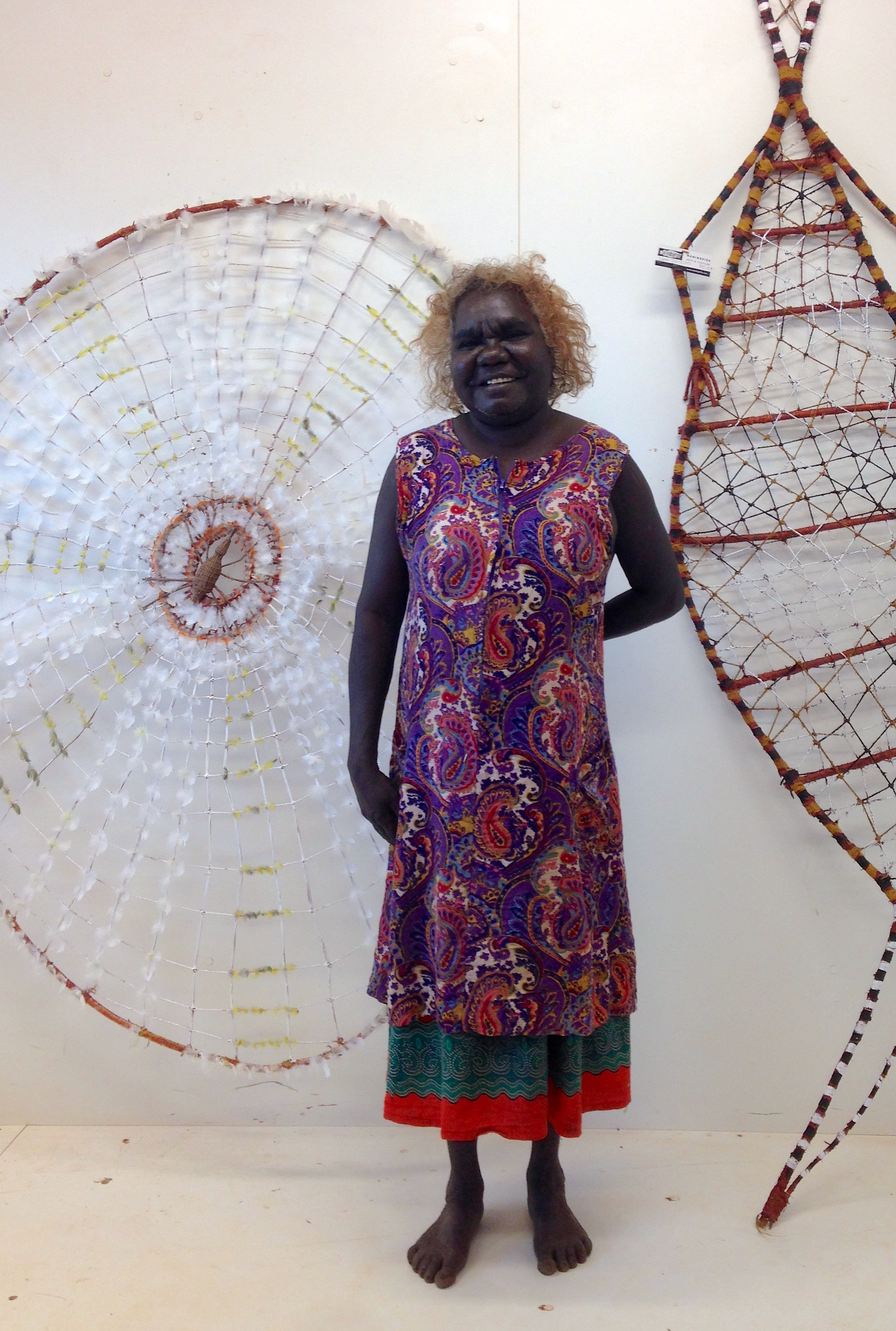
Lena Yarinkura at the Maningrida Arts and Culture Centre, Maningrida, Northern Territory, Australia, May 2015

Lena Yarinkura (born 1961) is an Aboriginal Australian artist from the Rembarrnga and Kune language groups from Arnhem Land in the Northern Territory. She is often credited for being the innovator of contemporary fibre art, producing multiple acclaimed works as well as creating a new school of fibre sculpture. She is a member of Maningrida Arts & Culture, an arts and crafts centre in Maningrida, Northern Territory.

Yarinkura was married to Kamarrang Bob Burruwal, who died in 2021. The couple worked together as a team, and most of the artworks created by either of them before Burruwal's death are collaborations.

== Early life ==
Yarinkura was born in 1961 in Buluhkarduru, Arnhem Land, Northern Territory, into the Yirritja moiety of the Yolngu peoples. She was born into three clans, namely, the from the Rembarrnga, Kune, and Burnungku clans and as a result, she is part of the Gotjjan subsection.

Yarinkura's life at Maningrida, an Aboriginal community located around 250 mi (400 km) east of Darwin on the Liverpool River in northeast Arnhem land, in the traditional country of the Kunibidji people, involved close contact with her mother, a skilled weaver and artisan, as well as her father's younger brother, Jack Wawee (var. Wawi) Yarinkura's mother, Lena Djamarrakyu, taught her how to do fibre art using pandanus fibres. Her father, Willie Mardangiya, died when she was a young child, leading to his younger brother, Jack Wawee, taking over as her father figure. Yarinkura grew up surrounded and immersed in her rich culture and learned the important ancestral stories and cultural teachings from both her parents and Elders in the community. From childhood, she was able to make traditional Aboriginal fibre forms such as dilly bags, large fish nets, and ceremonial dance belts, all of which served a utilitarian purpose in her community. She mastered all these techniques.

== Career ==
Her career as a contemporary fibre artist jumpstarted with her marriage to Bob Burruwal, another Aboriginal artist, in the mid-1980s. Diane Moon, Maningrida's arts advisor at the time, helped foster Yarinkura's artistic talent as a bark painter and fibre artist with later potential as a sculptor as well. Bob Burruwal participated in male-dominated fields such as bark painting and hollow log coffins; his practice influenced Yarinkura to incorporate those ideas into her fibre forms, morphing these fibres into structural painted artworks such as animals, spirits, and ancestors, using traditional materials like pandanus fibres and natural earth pigments. Yarinkura later used the same artistic techniques required for twining pandanus to create more innovative figures such as the Ngayang Spirit, yawk yawks, dogs, and bush animals.

There was a period of time where Yarinkura and her family were the only ones creating this type of fibre art sculpture, that illustrate local myths and hunting stories. Overall, all of her creations stem from a place of "Dreaming" and her desire and yearning to express her knowledge rather than trying to satisfy the art market.

When Yarinkura ventured into bark painting and began carving hollow log sculptures, this change in media and overall scale motivated a shift in her work and overall approach to fibre. She began to make traditional long yam sculptures from paperbark, bound by string (made from kurrajong tree bark), and painted them with distinctive red and white ochres. During this shift, Yarinkura began to produce near life-size representations of the major ancestral cycles told by the elders of western and central Arnhem land.

In 1994, she and her husband first experimented with a new binding technique with Family Drama (1994), a group work depicting a traditional burial scene that included four human figures, a dog, and a raised platform. Accordingly, the two drew their inspiration from both ancestral creator beings (e.g., spirits such as Wurum) and everyday life (e.g., feral bush pigs). Yarinkura also made conscious efforts to reference some of the most important Aboriginal ancestral beings, such as the Rainbow Serpent (Ngalyod), in her works such as Sacred waterholes.

Not long afterwards, she bent the form once again, using nontraditional materials like bronze, tin, and aluminium to make these works. Along with her husband, they drew upon such fibre weaving and ceremonial object representations to adapt with new techniques of moulding with plasticine and construction for sculptures. To illustrate the stories that belong to her and her husband, Yarinkura made paperbark and woven sculptures of a range of spirit figures, dogs, yawkyawks (mermaid-like spirits), and crocodiles, which had precedents in men's ceremonial objects rarely seen after the 1960s. For example, she made five camp dog sculptures representing dogs in her real family; she comically made the dogs appear sick, angry, and cheeky.

Yarinkura collaborated with Burruwal to make some of her acclaimed works, but after his death, Yolanda Rostron, her daughter, became her art partner. Yarinkura's generational knowledge, in particular the skills of basketry and pandanus-weaving learned from her mother Lena Djamarrayku, have been passed down to her daughter and, later, her granddaughter Philomena Kelly. As the Maningrida art market grew, she turned her focus toward coiled basketmaking.

Yarinkura held her first solo exhibition at Gallery Gabrielle Pizzi in Melbourne, showcasing her fibre structures, further differentiating herself and becoming a more independent artist.

=== Urban Art Projects ===
Yarinkura collaborated with the Urban Art Projects (UAP) in 1999 with Judy Watson. She developed a longterm relationship with the organisation, through a metal-casting workshop at Maningrida Arts and Culture Centre. UAP developed new casting methods based on Yarinkura's work, and together they later developed Seven Dogs, an art installation held at Brisbane Airport Skygate in 2010.

== Artistic practice and impact ==
Yarinkura and Burruwal's career was highly impactful in the artistic scene, inventing a whole new genre of art. Without their contributions, its likely that these new forms of fibre arts would never had come to fruition. As her works grew larger in scale and intricacy, Yarinkura became increasingly inspired to utilise the various traditional stories of her people to help narrate her works. She is known for redefining the boundaries of fibre art; her work transforms traditional techniques like twining, weaving, and netting into powerful visual expressions of cultural identity. She demonstrates the ability to integrate tradition with innovation in a manner that still highlights Aboriginal culture.

Although Diane Moon and Burruwal may have helped foster Yarinkura's artistic talent, Yarinkura states that noone specifically taught her how to use pandanus to make animals. She teaches herself and creates new ways to create these sculptures. Yarinkura views her artistic inventions as being highly integrated with her country, as she often attributes most her creations to the direct connection between herself and her country It is of great importance that she passes down these skills to her children and grandchildren because Yarinkura knows one day she will be gone and wants them to take her place. Yarinkura's talent as a contemporary artist is recognised by many at the highest level, as her works are represented in almost every major Australian cultural institution and various significant private collections.

Known for her pandanus and fibre sculptures, Yarinkura's method weaving is similar to the process used for making a dilly bag or fish trap. She used this same technique of twining pandanus fibres to create the figures in her 1996 sculpture Ngayang Spirit, which included two human-like forms and a woven mat. Yarinkura's works often start with her harvesting the natural material from the local landscape near her outstation on her mother's Country called Bolkdjam, not far from Maningrida. Although Yarinkura does have a beginning process to her weaving, she follows her artistic liberties, allowing for spontaneity in the art making process.

=== Materials ===
Yarinkura typically chooses to use natural materials which she harvests and collects from her local environment in Bolkdjam. She used materials such as dayarr (pandanus), rulk (grass), warlpupurrunggu (bush turkey), nganarrngh (black cockatoo), feathers, and marnarr (red ochre), garbla (yellow ochre), gamununggu (white clay), and roerroe (black ashes).

== Motifs and artworks ==
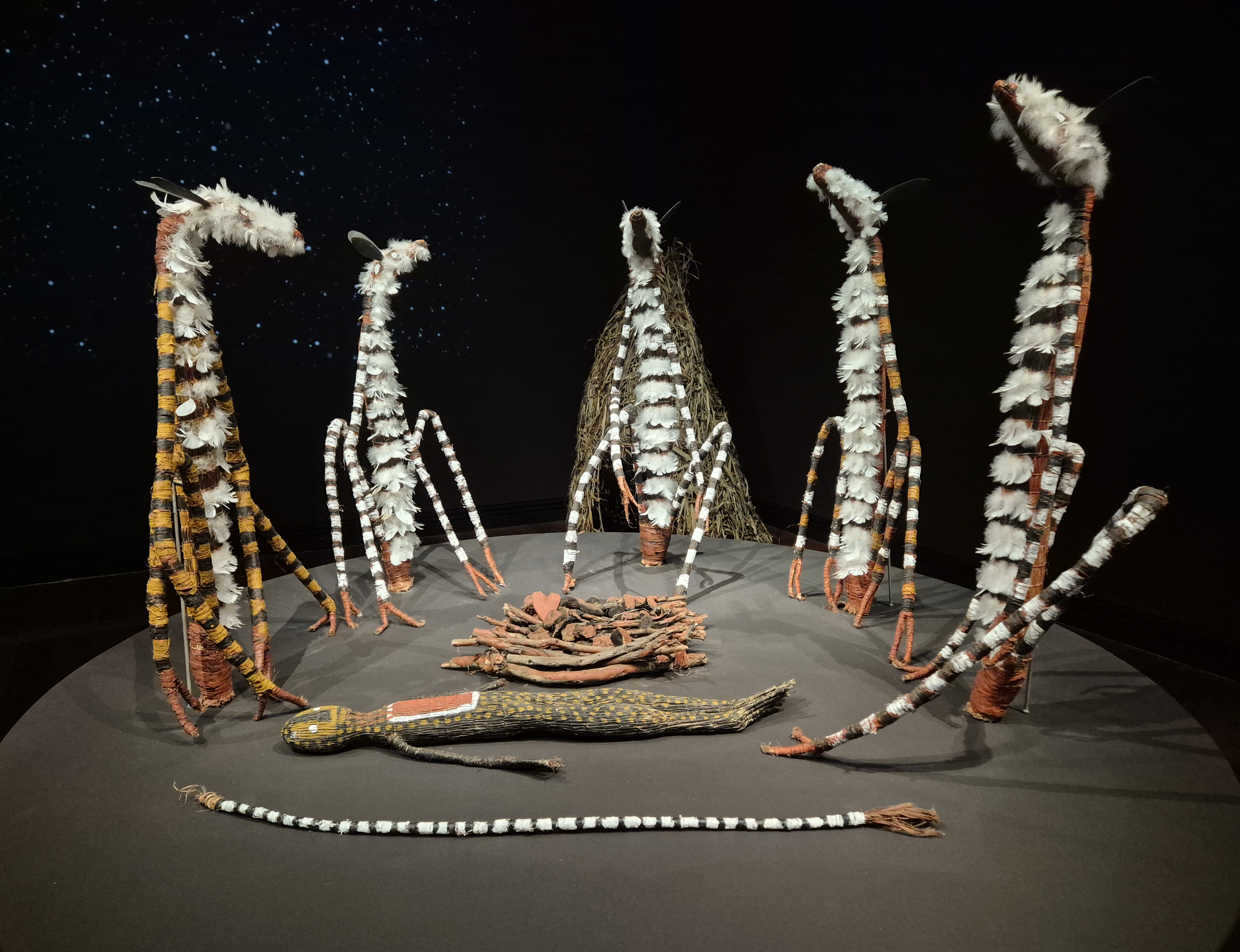
Namorrorddo, group of figures by Lena Yarinkura and Bob Burruwal (2017)

Yarinkura is featured as one of the nine prominent Aboriginal women artists whose works are showcased in an exhibition called Marking the Infinite, which highlights their contributions to contemporary Aboriginal art, as well as their roles as matriarchs in their communities. The other eight artists featured were Nonggirrnga Marawili, Wintjiya Napaltjarri, Yukultji Napangati, Angelina Pwerle, Carlene West, Regina Pilawuk Wilson, Gulumbu Yunupingu, and Nyapanyapa Yunupingu.

The 2020 Tarnanthi annual Indigenous art showcase at the Art Gallery of South Australia was subtitled Open Hands, and featured Ngalbenbe, an installation created by Yarinkura and her daughter Yolanda Rostron. This piece represents the important ancestral contribution in the cosmology of the people of Arnhem Land, specifically the Kune and Rembarrnga peoples. The series of sculptures are made from pandanus, paperbark, feathers, rocks, sand, earth pigments, and natural dyes. Ngalbenbe shows the story of the sun (Ngalbenbe) and three fishermen who go to fish with their butterfly fish trap (Walabi).

The yawkyawk are young girls that have transformation powers granted by the Rainbow Serpent, Ngalmudj. At times, they are compared to mermaids since they are illustrated as the tail of a fish. Parts of the Yawk Yawks' bodies are associated with the land; for example, the bend of a river can be considered the tail and the billabong can be the head. Yarinkura inherited the rights and responsibilities to depict the yawk yawk from her mother, making the yawk yawk one of her signatures. While there are various interpretations of yawkyawk mythologies among the different language groups, Yarinkura depicts them in accordance with her belief that yawkyawk are the same as those still living in a sacred billabong near her outstation. She created at least two works titled Yawkyawk in 2015.

Spiders became another of her motifs, symbolising a transformation of old techniques with new ideas. Spiderwebs represent the suspension of innovation, constantly changing shape while still maintaining integral concepts that are passed down through generations. The spider is a manifestation of Yarinkura's Dreaming, or ancestral connection, of constant change while protecting her Country. One of these works, Spider web (2010), consisting of natural earth pigments on bush spring and pandanus fibre, was displayed in the exhibition Alive and spirited at the National Gallery of Australia. Her spider sculptures are not only a representation of the insect, but also act as a metaphor; the entanglement between the Dreaming and conscious world, as well as protecting one's country and land. The spider (karrh) is not inherently sacred and has no spiritual meaning, but is often used by artists in the region. It is a symbolic figure that brings warnings or omens related to death and illness. In 2010, Yarinkura created a work of contemporary art which depicted a spider on a web, made from the roots of a cocky apple tree (manworrbal), yellow ochre (karlba), and white cockatoo feathers (ngarradj). Her web is both old and new, traditional and innovative, and regionally specific, but also universal due to Yarinkura's conscious effort to mediate between her world and that of the outside world. Her spider artworks include:

- Spider (2015), twined pandanus palm leaf, paperbark, natural pigments, and feathers, 106.625 x 63 in. (271 x 160 cm.)
- Spider in a tree at Bulakadaru (2004), natural earth pigments on paperbark and kapok, 107 x 90 cm.
- Karrh kunred (2010), natural earth pigments on bush string and Pandanus fibre, 205.0 h x 214.5 w cm.
- Spider (2015), twined pandanus palm leaf, paperbark, natural pigments and feathers, 156 x 121 cm.

== Recognition and awards ==
- 1994 - $3,000 Wandjuk Marika 3D Memorial Award for Family Drama (1994) with Bob Burruwal This was awarded at the National Aboriginal & Torres Strait Islander Art Awards, the work consisted of six life-size bound paper-bark sculptures adorned as if they were attending a funeral with related spears, feather strings, and dilly bags accordingly.
- 1997 - $3,000 Wandjuk Marika 3D Memorial Award for her work Family of Yawks Yawks
- 1998 – Professional Development Grant, Australia Council for the Arts, Aboriginal Arts Unit
- 2009 - Togart Contemporary Art Award, co-winner, for her "YawkYawk" submission, depicting the spirit and its narrative

== Personal life ==
Yarinkura and her husband, Bob Burruwal (1952-2021), lived on an outstation named Bolkdjam, approximately 60 km (37 mi) south of Maningrida.

After Burruwal's death, Yolanda Rostron, her daughter, became her art partner.

== Collections ==
- Art Gallery of New South Wales, Sydney
- Art Gallery of South Australia, Adelaide
- Australian Museum, Sydney
- Australian National Maritime Museum, Sydney
- Djomi Museum, Maningrida
- Kluge-Ruhe Aboriginal Art Collection of the University of Virginia
- Museum and Art Gallery of the Northern Territory, Darwin
- Museum DHistoire Naturelle de Lyon, France
- Museum of Contemporary Art Australia, Sydney
- National Gallery of Australia, Canberra
- National Gallery of Victoria, Melbourne
- Nevada Museum of Art, Reno
- Queensland Art Gallery, Brisbane

== Exhibitions ==
- 2020 - Tarnanthi 2020: Open Hands, Art Gallery of South Australia, Adelaide, SA
- 2017 - Tarnanthi 2017, Art Gallery of South Australia, Adelaide, SA
- 2009 – Ancestral Spirit Beings and Ceremonial Lorrkon, Gallery Gabreille Pizzi, Melbourne, VIC
- 2004 – Australian culture now, National Gallery of Victoria, Melbourne, VIC
- 2004 – Maningrida Fibre Art, Rebecca Hossack Gallery, London, UK
- 2003 – Maningrida Threads, Museum of Contemporary Art, Sydney, NSW
- 2001 – Out of the Mould: An exhibition of the first works in bronze and aluminum from Maningrida, Gallery Pizzi, Melbourne, VIC
- 2001 – National Sculpture Prize, National Gallery of Australia, Canberra, ACT
- 2000 – Tamworth Fibre Textile Biennial: Frisson, Tamworth City Gallery, Tamworth, NSW
- 2000 – Biennale of Sydney 2000, various venues at various locations, Sydney, NSW
- 1999 – Spinifex Runner: A collection of contemporary Aboriginal and Torres Strait Islander fibre art, Campbelltown City Bicentennial Art Gallery, Campbelltown, NSW
- 1995 – Maningrida: The Language of Weaving, AETA Touring Exhibition throughout Australia and New Zealand
- 1995 - Australian National Heritage Art Award in Canberra (Yarinkura and Burruwal's second narrative sculpture group Modjarkki, Two Brothers and the Crocodile)
- 1989, 1994, 1997, 2002, 2004, 2005, 2007 Telstra National Aboriginal and Torres Strait Islander Art Award, Museum and Art Gallery of the Northern Territory, Darwin, NT
