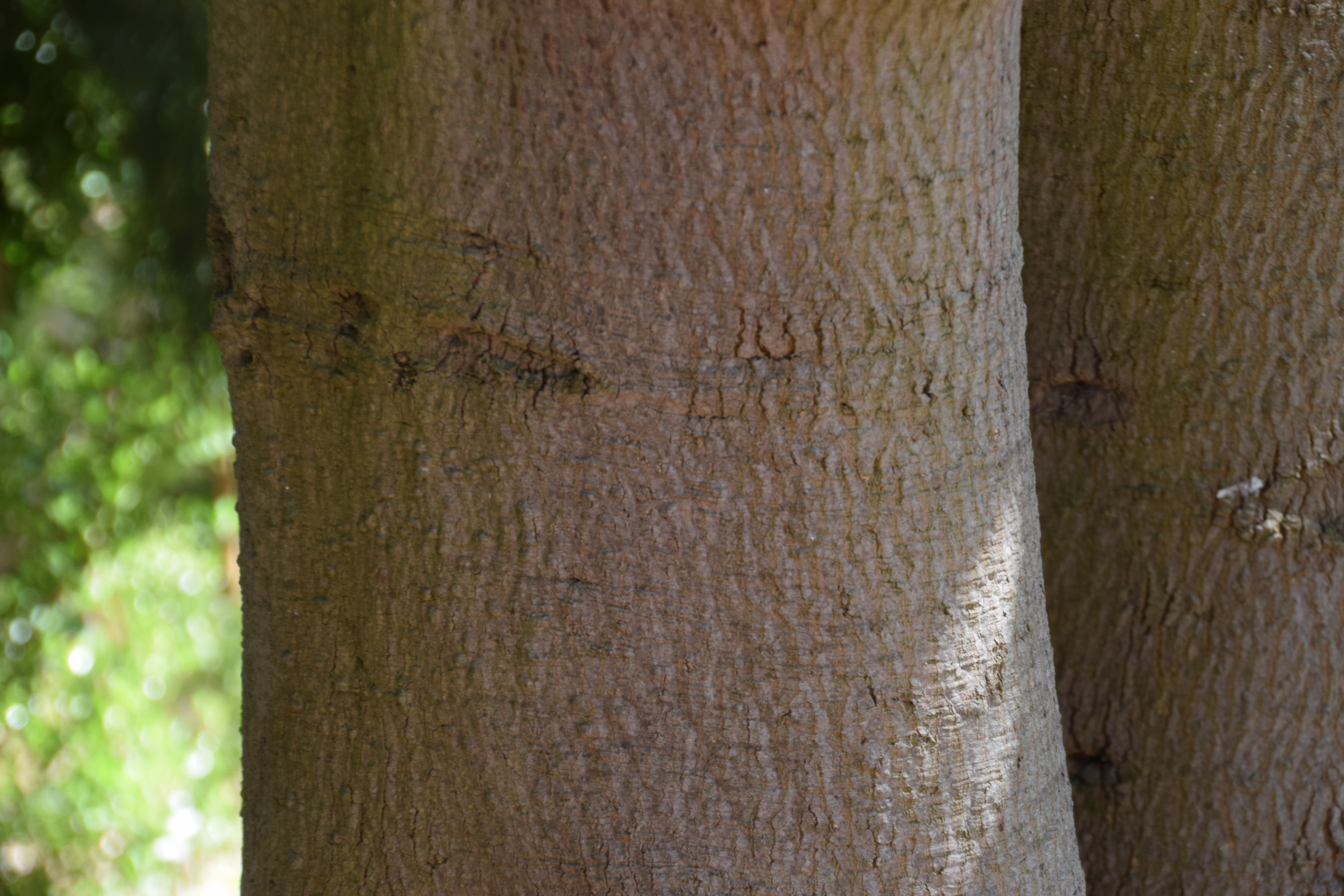

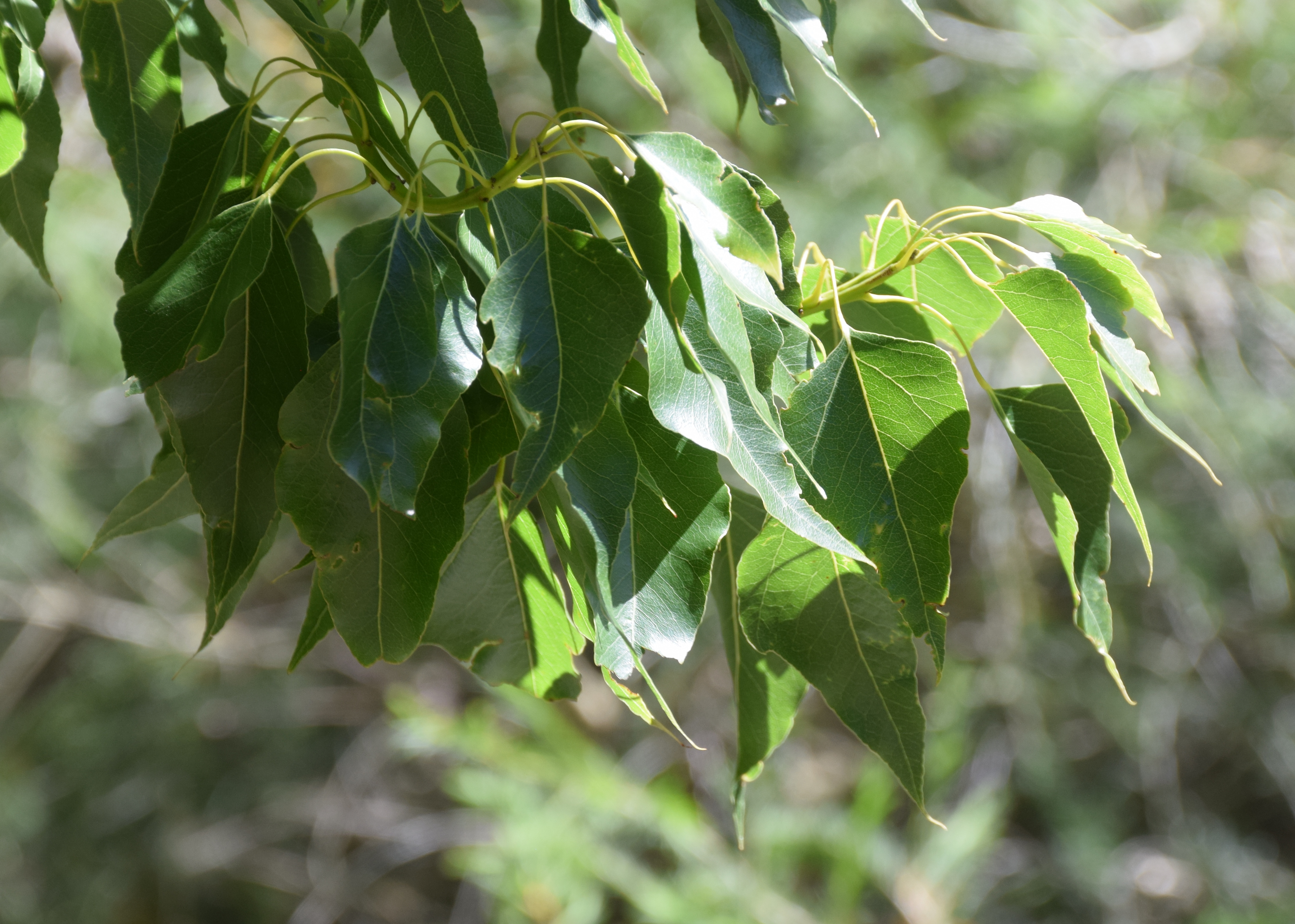
- Bark and foliage

Scientific classification
- Kingdom: Plantae
- Clade: Tracheophytes
- Clade: Angiosperms
- Clade: Eudicots
- Clade: Rosids
- Order: Malvales
- Family: Malvaceae
- Genus: Brachychiton
- Species: B. diversifolius

Binomial name
- Brachychiton diversifolius R.Br.

= Brachychiton diversifolius =

Northern kurrajong

Species of tree

Brachychiton diversifolius, commonly known as the northern kurrajong, is a small tree of the genus Brachychiton found in northern Australia. It was originally classified in the family Sterculiaceae, which is now within Malvaceae. (Note: The genus Brachychiton was traditionally placed in the family Sterculiaceae, but that family, along with Bombacaceae and Tiliaceae, has been found to be polyphyletic and is now sunk into a more broadly-defined Malvaceae)
