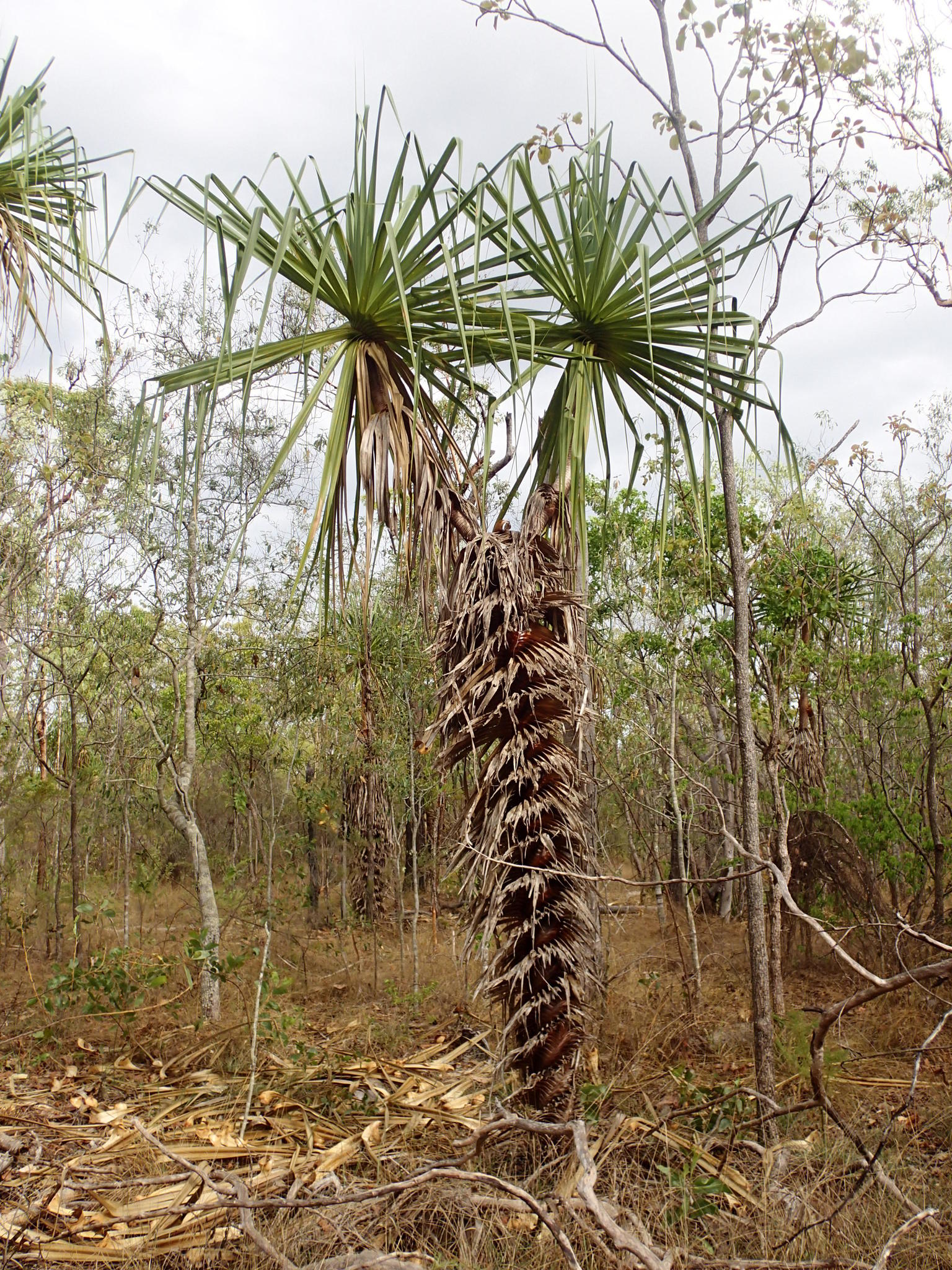
- Growing in Kakadu National Park

Conservation status
- Least Concern (IUCN 3.1)

Scientific classification
- Kingdom: Plantae
- Clade: Embryophytes
- Clade: Tracheophytes
- Clade: Spermatophytes
- Clade: Angiosperms
- Clade: Monocots
- Order: Pandanales
- Family: Pandanaceae
- Genus: Pandanus
- Species: P. spiralis

Binomial name
- Pandanus spiralis R.Br.

= Pandanus spiralis =

Species of plant native to Australia

Pandanus spiralis is a small tree in the family Pandanaceae native to northern Australia. It is commonly called pandanus, spring pandanus, screw palm or screw pine, although it is neither a palm nor a pine.

== Description ==
Pandanus spiralis is a small tree growing up to 10 m (33 ft) tall with a slender trunk, and often with a clumping habit. Prop roots may be present, but are more often absent. The leaves are 1–2 m (3 ft 3 in – 6 ft 7 in) long and 4–7 cm (1.6–2.8 in) wide, and they may or may not have sharp spines along the leaf margins and midrib. They are arranged spirally on the trunk and branches, and crowded towards their tips. As the leaves die they can form a dense pendant skirt around the trunk below the growing part, and lower down on the trunk the leaf bases often persist, forming a conspicuous spiral.

The inflorescences are terminal—on the male plants it is a pendant string of several spadices each about 5 cm (2 in) long, while on the female plants it is a single head about 20–30 cm (8–12 in) long shrouded by large leafy bracts.

The fruit is a multiple fruit consisting of 10–25 segments measuring 8–10 cm (3.1–3.9 in) long and 5–8 cm (2.0–3.1 in) wide, known as "phalanges". The phalanges are composed of a dense fibrous material with 5–7 seeds embedded in it. The fruit is initially green and turn orange or red when ripe.

== Taxonomy ==
This species was first described by the Scottish botanist Robert Brown in his book Prodromus floræ Novæ Hollandiæ et Insulæ Van-Diemen, published in 1810.

=== Infraspecies ===
Five varieties are recognised as of June 2024, as follows:

- Pandanus spiralis var. convexus (H.St.John) B.C.Stone – synonyms P. convexus H.St.John and P. integer H.St.John
- Pandanus spiralis var. flammeus B.C.Stone
- Pandanus spiralis var. multimammillatus B.C.Stone
- Pandanus spiralis var. spiralis – autonym
- Pandanus spiralis var. thermalis (H.St.John) B.C.Stone – synonym P. thermalis H.St.John

== Distribution and habitat ==
This species occurs in northern Queensland, the Northern Territory and the extreme north of Western Australia. It grows in savannah woodlands and poorly drained areas such as alongside creeks and rivers, the margins of floodplains, and coastal dunes, on various substrates including sand, alluvium and clay.

== Ecology ==
The dense skirt of old leaves provides a refuge for many forms of wildlife including birds, bats, rodents and lizards. The seeds within the fruit are eaten by cockatoos and possums.

== Uses ==
The leaves of this tree are used to weave various products such as neckbands, armbands, baskets, mats, fish traps and shelters, and the fibre can be stripped out to make string for dillybags and other uses. The trunks are used to build rafts. The plant has a number of medicinal uses including as an antiseptic, analgesic, and to treat dysentery and diarrhoea.. The white stem part of the leaf is pounded to make an anaesthetic for tooth pain. The leaf bases are eaten and the seeds can be eaten raw or roasted, and may be ground to make flour. The fully ripe fruit are used ceremonially because of their scent.

== Gallery ==
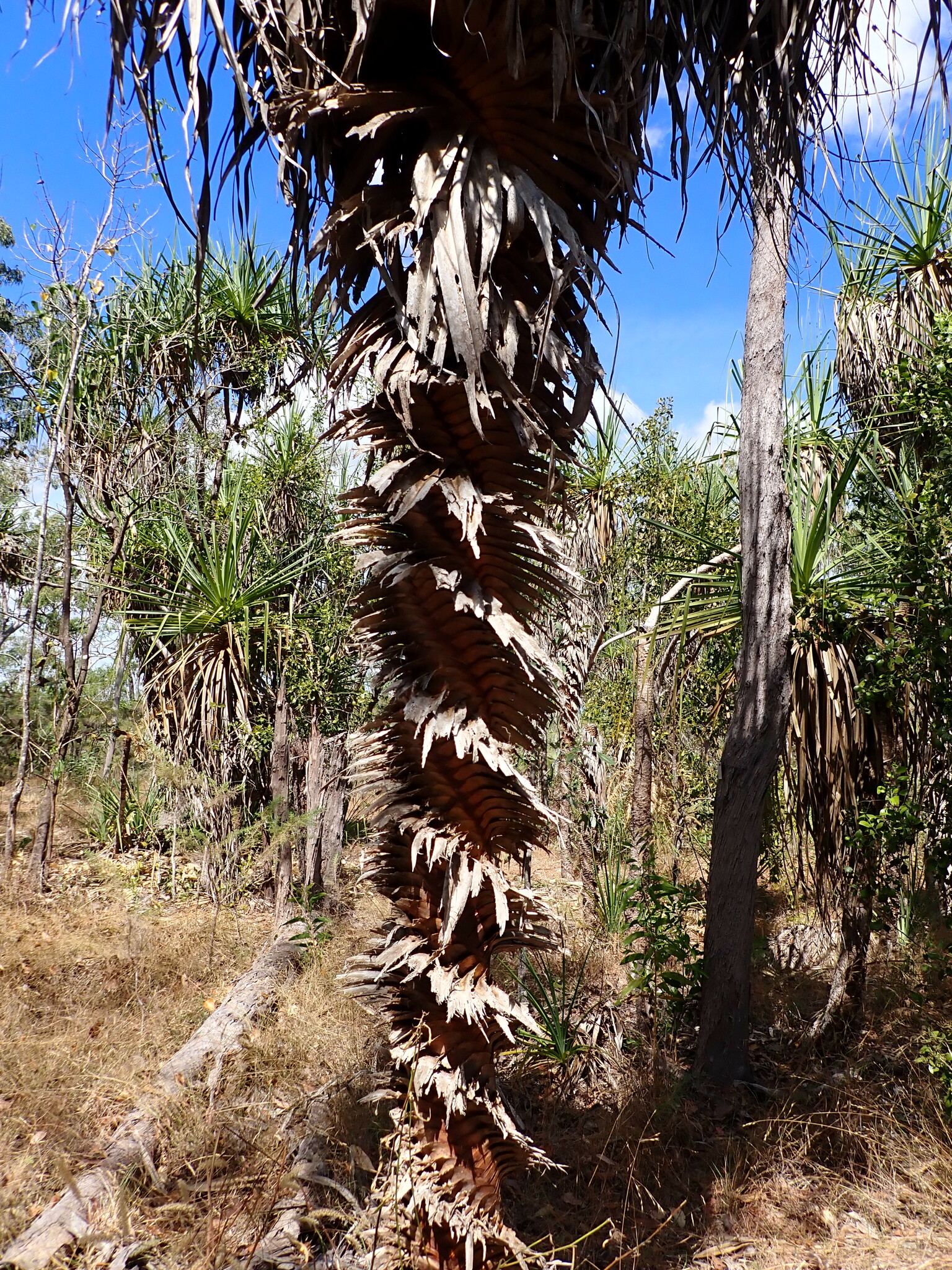
Trunk with persistent leaf bases

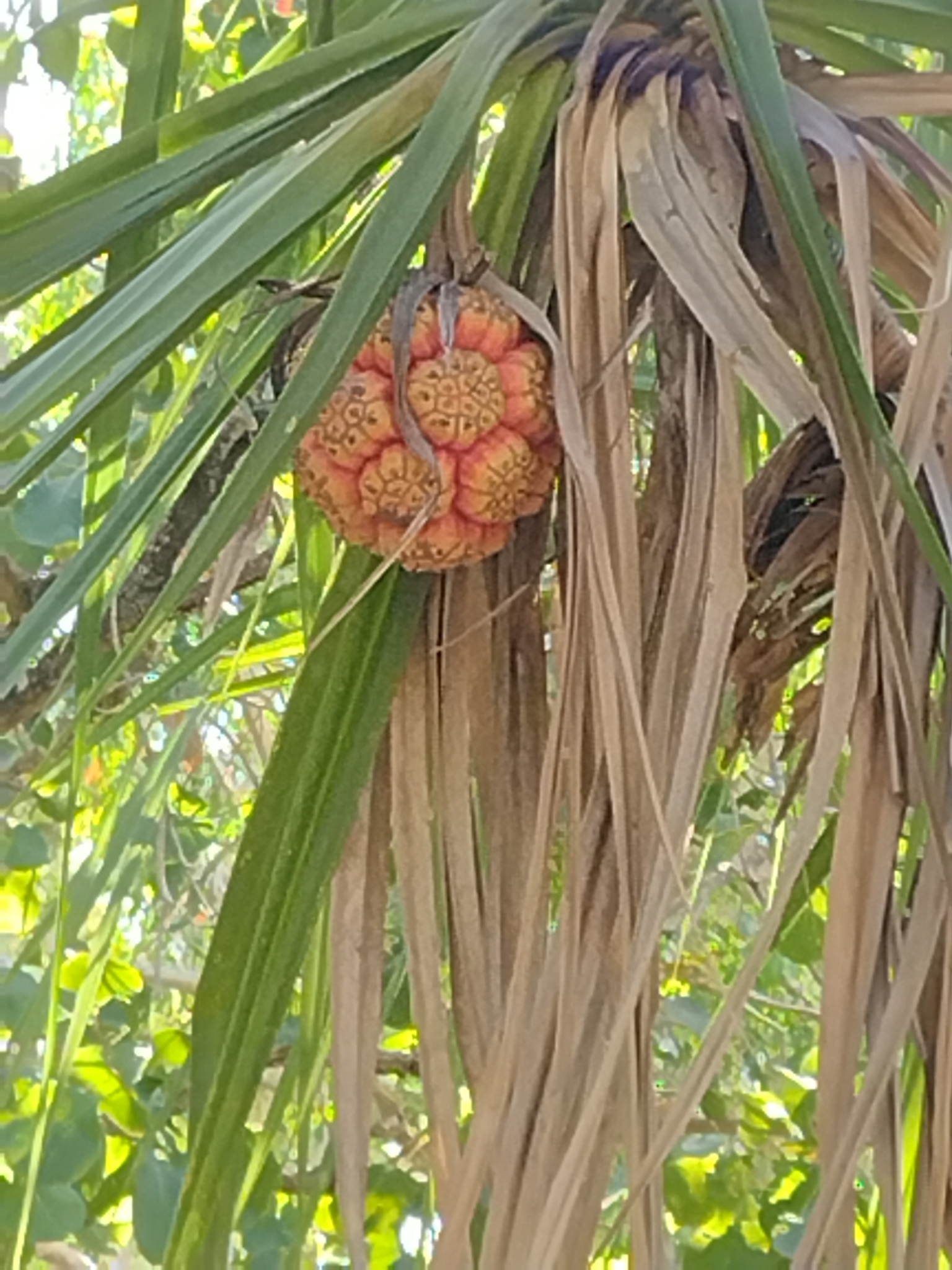
Ripening fruit

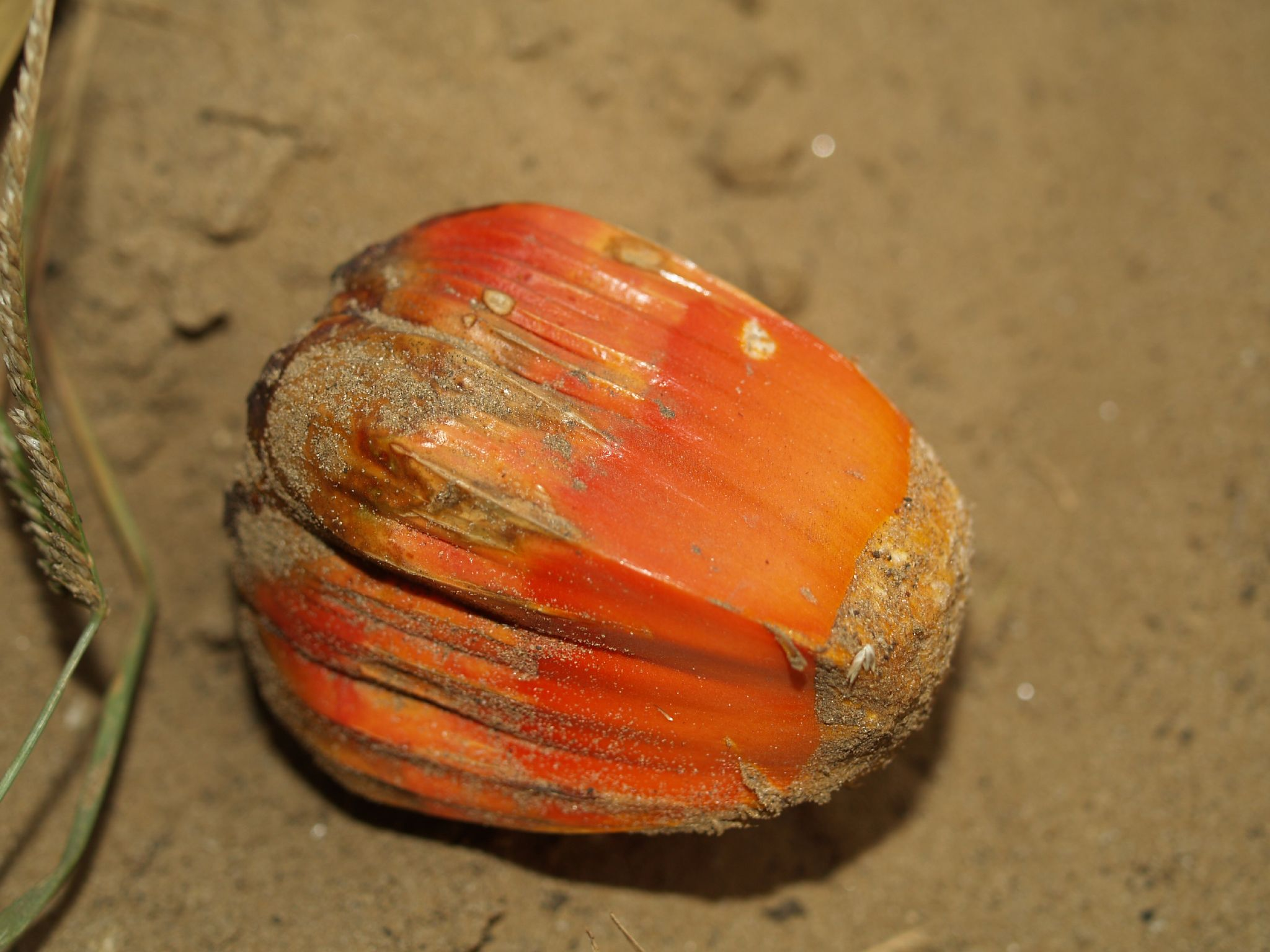
A segment (phalange) of the fallen fruit

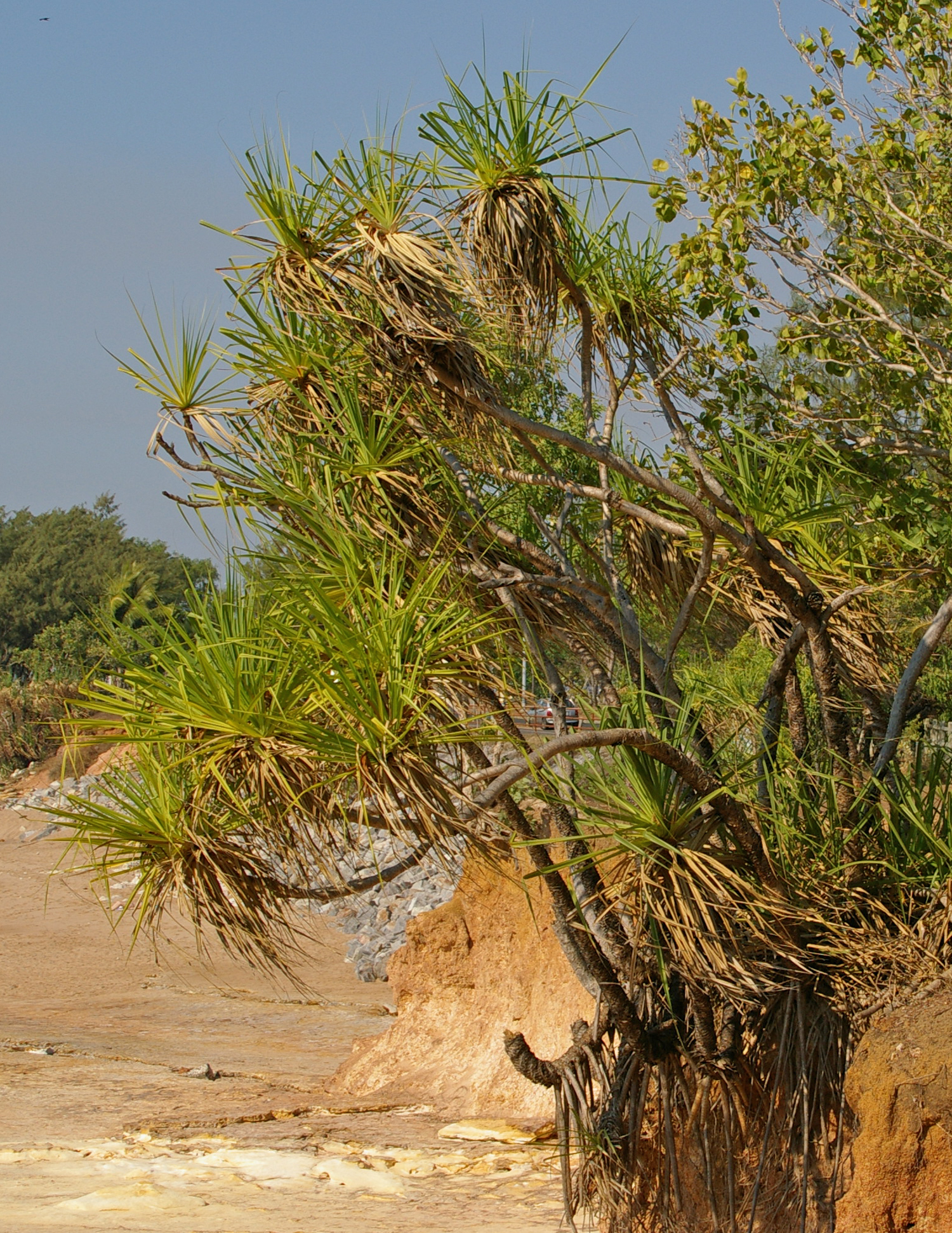
Growing on a coastal sandbank

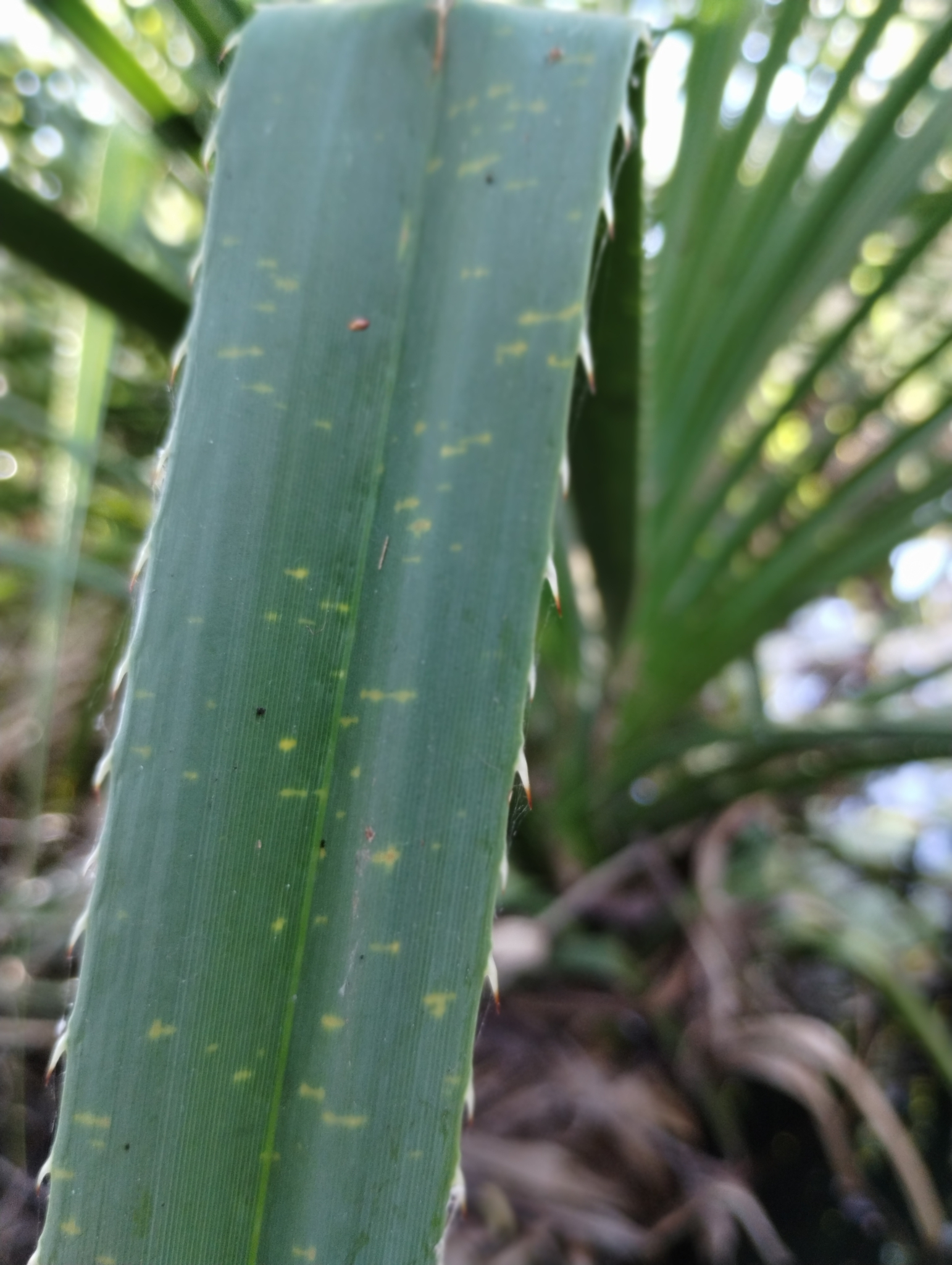
Detail of spines on the leaf margin

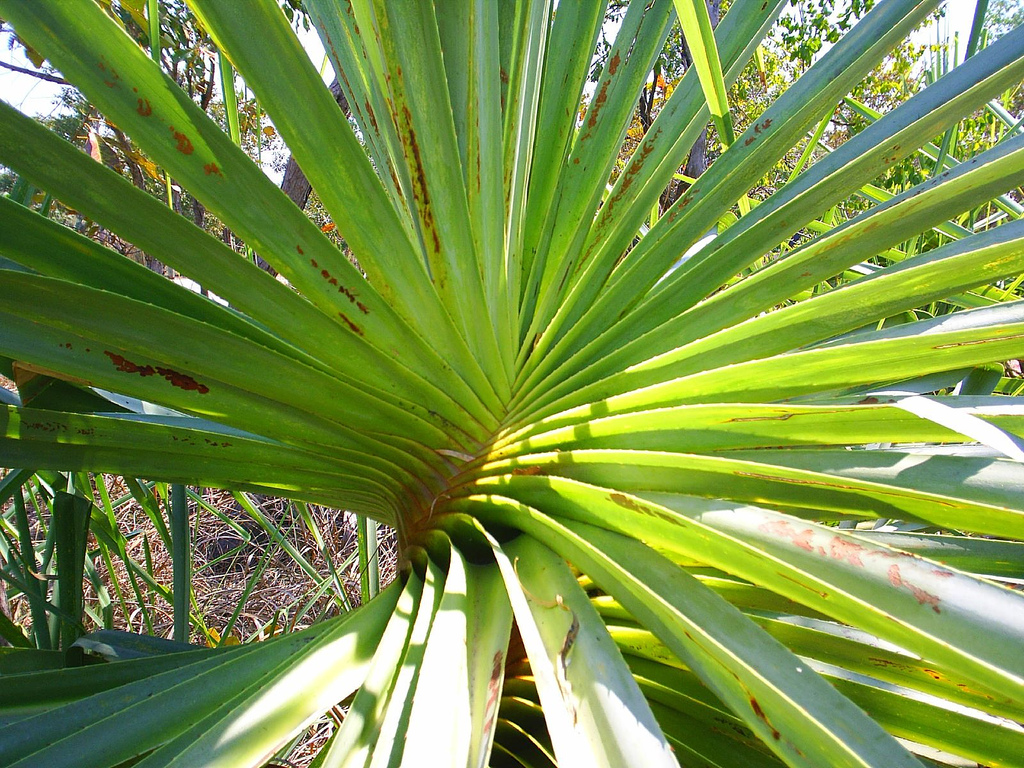
Spiral arrangement of the leaves
