= Yawkyawk =

Mythological creature

The Yawkyawk, sometimes spelt yawk yawk and also known as ngal-kunburriyaymi, is an Aboriginal Australian mythological female water spirit, originating in the mythology of the Kunwinjku people of Western Arnhem Land, Northern Territory, Australia.

== Description ==
The yawkyawk, also known as ngal-kunburriyaymi, is a mythological female water spirit of Western Arnhem Land, often called "mermaids" by non-Indigenous people, usually represented with a female head and torso, but with scales on the abdomen, and possessing a fish tail. The word Yawkyawk means "young woman" or "young woman spirit being" in the Kunwinjku language.

The ancient myth of the Yawkyawk freshwater spirits tells of two young women, Likanaya and Marrayka, crossing Kuninjku Country. They were turned into young girl spirits with fish tails because they camped too close to the sacred waterhole of Ngalyod (the Rainbow Serpent, a creator being). Yawkyawk transformation stories are closely interwoven with Ngalyod at certain sacred locations.

The yawkyawks are believed to live in freshwater creeks, billabongs, and rock pools, with fish and small insects in these habitats being different forms of them, and water weed signifying their long hair. The yawkyawks are amphibious and may lie in the sun on the banks. Specific geographical features are related to parts of the yawkyawk: a river bend may be her tail, and a billabong her head. They also tell the story of a river.

== Significance and representation ==
Yawkyawk stories link clans and other groupings across Kuninjku Country, and are celebrated in the art, song, and dance of the Kunwinjku people. Artists such as Lena Yarinkura have represented the yawkyawk in their works of art.

The story also has educational value; Yawkyawk are magical and enticing but also warn of danger, especially children. As guardians and protectors of important water sites, needed for survival during the dry season, they serve as a warning to people not to wander to places where they should not be.
