= El Sherana =

Abandoned uranium mine in South Alligator River Valley, Northern Territory, Australia

Coordinates: 13.5094°S 132.5209°E

El Sherana is an abandoned uranium mine in the South Alligator River Valley of the Northern Territory, Australia.

The deposit was discovered in 1954 by a United Uranium NL exploration team, led by Joe Fischer, with a ground radiometric survey. The site was named after the daughters of a team staff member, William 'Bluey' Halpin Kay - Elvira, Sherryl and Lana. El Sherana operated from 1958 to 1959 and El Sherana West from 1961 to 1964.

El Sherana was the largest producer of high grade uranium ore (with minor gold and silver) amongst the mines along the South Alligator River Valley. It had underground and open-cut operations. Production from El Sherana was 38,437 long tons at a grade of 12.42 lb U_{3}O_{8} per long ton (0.55% U_{3}O_{8}). From El Sherana West, 21,316 long tons at a grade of 18.35 lb U_{3}O_{8} per long ton (0.82% U_{3}O_{8}) were produced.

At El Sherana and El Sherana West, uranium-gold mineralisation occurs in two general settings: at or near the shallow-dipping Koolpin Formation/Coronation Sandstone unconformity, where it is cut by normal and reverse faults (El Sherana pit). The host rocks are chert-banded siltstone and carbonaceous shale adjacent to sandstone (Coronation Sandstone) and altered volcanics (Pul Pul Rhyolite), in irregular zones along the contacts between cherty ferruginous shale and carbonaceous shale (El Sherana West). The ore consisted of massive pods and disseminated veinlets of pitchblende, with secondary metatorbernite, autunite, gummite and gold, with minor pyrite, galena and chalcopyrite. Gold occurred as veinlets within pitchblende or as separate zones of mineralisation. Gold distribution extends beyond the high grade pitchblende pods that in places contain visible gold and forms an envelope around the poddy high grade uranium mineralisation, with grades of up to 0.2 ounce per ton (5.5 g/tonne).

== Political importance ==
El Sherana was included in the 1988 proposal of BHP to mine at the nearby Coronation Hill which also had been briefly mined for uranium in the 1950s.

Opposed environmental campaigns came from many organisations including the Kakadu Action Group founded by Lindsay Mollison, part of the Australian Conservation Foundation.

After some years of community debate the proposal was vetoed in a Cabinet Meeting, despite internal disagreement, by then Prime Minister, Bob Hawke, in May 1991. His actions in Cabinet that day were regarded by some as important in his ultimately being replaced later that year.

The El Sherana site was rehabilitated between 1988 and 1992. The area was added to Kakadu National Park after the proposal was defeated.
