= Gagudju Crocodile Hotel =

Hotel in Jabiru, Northern Territory, Australia

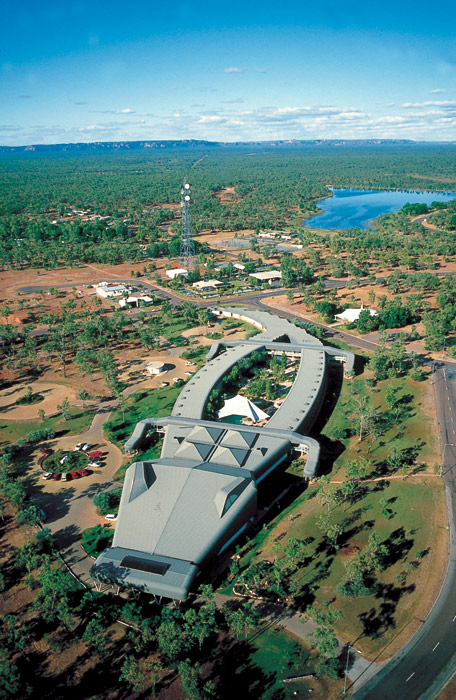
- Interactive map of the Gagudju Crocodile Hotel area

General information
- Location: Jabiru, Northern Territory
- Coordinates: 12°40′13″S 132°49′52″E
- Opening: 1988
- Owner: Kakadu Tourism Group
- Operator: Accor Hotels

Technical details
- Floor count: 2

Design and construction
- Architect: John Wilkins
- Developer: Gagudju Association

Other information
- Number of rooms: 110
- Number of restaurants: 1
- Parking: Available, complementary

Website
- all.accor.com

The Gagudju Crocodile Hotel, also known as Kakadu Crocodile Hotel or just the Croc Hotel, is a 3.5 star hotel located in Jabiru, Northern Territory, within Australia's Kakadu National Park. Owned by the Indigenous clans of the Gaagudju people, it was the first major tourism development in the National Park and is notable for its unique design in the shape of a crocodile. Since 2014, the hotel has been operated by the Accor group under the Mercure brand.

== History ==
Following the declaration of Kakadu as a National Park in 1979, the township of Jabiru was established as a closed community to house workers at the Ranger Uranium Mine. The Park's second management plan in 1986 recognised the potential for the town's role to be expanded as a service centre to support tourism related development in consultation with traditional land owners.

The Gagudju Association, representing Aboriginal clans from the Kakadu area, submitted plans for the hotel in 1987. The design was for a two-story, 110-120 room hotel including restaurants, bars and conference facilities contained within a structure shaped like a crocodile. Although the animal carries spiritual significance to the Gaagudju people, the international success of the film Crocodile Dundee in 1986 also influenced the chosen design.

The hotel was constructed by the John Holland Group, opening in 1988. While the Gagudju Association first approached Four Seasons Limited to manage the hotel, the Southern Pacific Hotels Group operated it from its opening until the company was acquired by Bass Hotels in 2000. Prior to the management rights being acquired by the Accor group in 2014, the hotel was branded as a Holiday Inn.

== Design ==
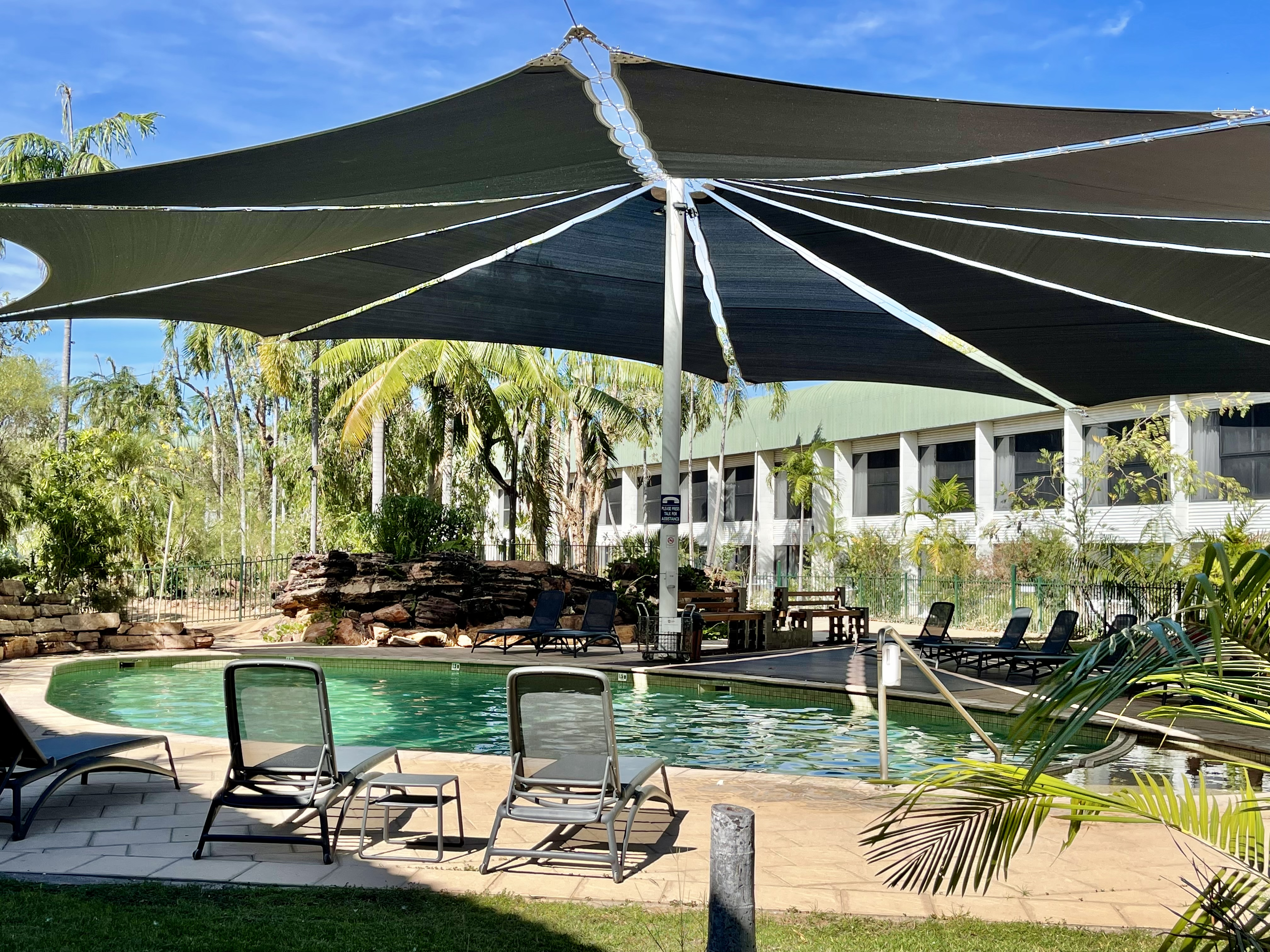
The courtyard and swimming pool in the "belly" of the crocodile

The building's unique shape is an interpretation of a totem representing the giant crocodile Ginga, a spirit ancestor of the Gaagudju people. The crocodile is 250 m (820 ft) long and up to 30 m (98 ft) wide, with the main entry through the animal's jaws, via a portico with supports shaped as teeth.

The head contains the main foyer and reception area, restaurant, cocktail bar, conference facilities as well as an art gallery. The guest rooms are arranged around central atrium and swimming pool, making up the crocodile's body. Within the tail section there are some suites, staff amenities and storage rooms.

Outside, open-air parking is provided in four small circular lots, that represent crocodile eggs when viewed from the air. Architectural features on the roof of the head section contain ventilation and air-conditioning equipment, with the outward facing panels lit up at night to resemble glowing eyes.

== Impact and criticism ==
The Crocodile Hotel has featured in a number international travel blogs and magazines owing to its unique appearance. It is frequently included in lists of odd and quirky hotels around the world by publications including Condé Nast Traveler, India's Outlook and New Zealand's Stuff. Kalya Ryan, in Lonely Planet's 50 Places To Stay To Blow Your Mind described it as having an "undeniably quirky edge, but nothing tacky". In 2016, the hotel won a Tourism Northern Territory Brolga Award for best unique accommodation.

The Gagudju Association was initially established to distribute royalties from uranium mining in Kakadu amongst local Aboriginal people and provide self-determination on how best to use this money to benefit the community. Under this model, the hotel's development was seen as a revenue-focussed investment, rather than a social enterprise and the association has little involvement in running it.

Although the venture has proven profitable, supporting an argument that it has provided economic benefits and employment without "selling-out" customs and traditions, it is not without criticism. In 2000 the hotel hosted a hospitality traineeship program for 22 indigenous participants. Despite this, in 2000 only 6 aboriginal people were employed by the Gagudju Association's tourism ventures.

In 1999, The Guardian reported that the association was forced to sell off assets from the hotel to pay debts owing from other parts of its operations. It was revealed that a large percentage of other mining royalties had been spent on alcohol while the local aboriginal community lived in poverty. Although drinking in public places is banned within the Jabiru, the hotel's public bar holds one of the few liquor licences in the town, facilitating problematic drinking that can damage the employment prospects of local aboriginal people and leading to erosion of traditional culture.

A further criticism raised by some local elders is that the increasing numbers of tourists brought in by the Croc Hotel and other developments have interfered with hunting and fishing practices, and a loss of privacy around traditional ceremonies within Kakadu and facilitated alcohol abuse that has eroded cultural customs.

== See also ==
- Jabiru, Northern Territory
- Kakadu National Park
- Gaagudju
