= Coronation Hill =

Area in Kakadu National Park, Northern Territory, Australia

Coordinates: 13°35′16″S 132°36′18″E

Coronation Hill is a sandstone outcrop within Kakadu National Park in the Northern Territory of Australia.

The area had been briefly mined for uranium at El Sherana in the 1950s and in 1988 proposals for new mining of gold were made.

When mining was proposed in 1988 the area existed as an excised zone of Kakadu National Park and was added to it after the proposal was defeated.

== Political importance ==
The Australian Government established the Resource Assessment Commission to provide a report to inform best decision making about new mining in the area.

Environmental, indigenous rights and social campaigns fought against allowing mining. Opposed environmental campaigns came from many organisations including the Kakadu Action Group founded by Lindsay Mollison, part of the Australian Conservation Foundation.

After some years of community debate the proposal was vetoed, despite internal disagreement, by then Prime Minister, Bob Hawke, in a Cabinet Meeting in May 1991. His actions in Cabinet that day were regarded as some as important in his ultimately being replaced later that year.

The area was added to the park as part of its stage 3 inclusions.

The decisions made with respect to Coronation Hill helped inform further decisions about other proposals to mine in Kakadu including rejection of a uranium mine at Jabiluka in the mid 1990s.
