= Nanguluwu =

- Interactive map of Nanguluwu
- 12°51′42″S 132°48′45″E

Nanguluwur or Nanguluwu is a small art site in the Kakadu National Park, near Nourlangie Rock, which is reached via the Gubara road then a 1.7 km walking track. Several rock art styles are represented here including hand stencils, dynamic figures in large head-dresses carrying spears and boomerangs, representations of Namandi spirits and mythical figures, including Alkajko, a female spirit with four arms and horn-like protuberances. There is also an interesting example of ‘contact art’ depicting a two-masted sailing ship with anchor chain and a dinghy trailing behind.
