= Maguk =

Coordinates: 13°18′59″S 132°26′15″E

Maguk (previously Barramundi Gorge) is located in the south of Kakadu National Park in the Northern Territory, Australia.

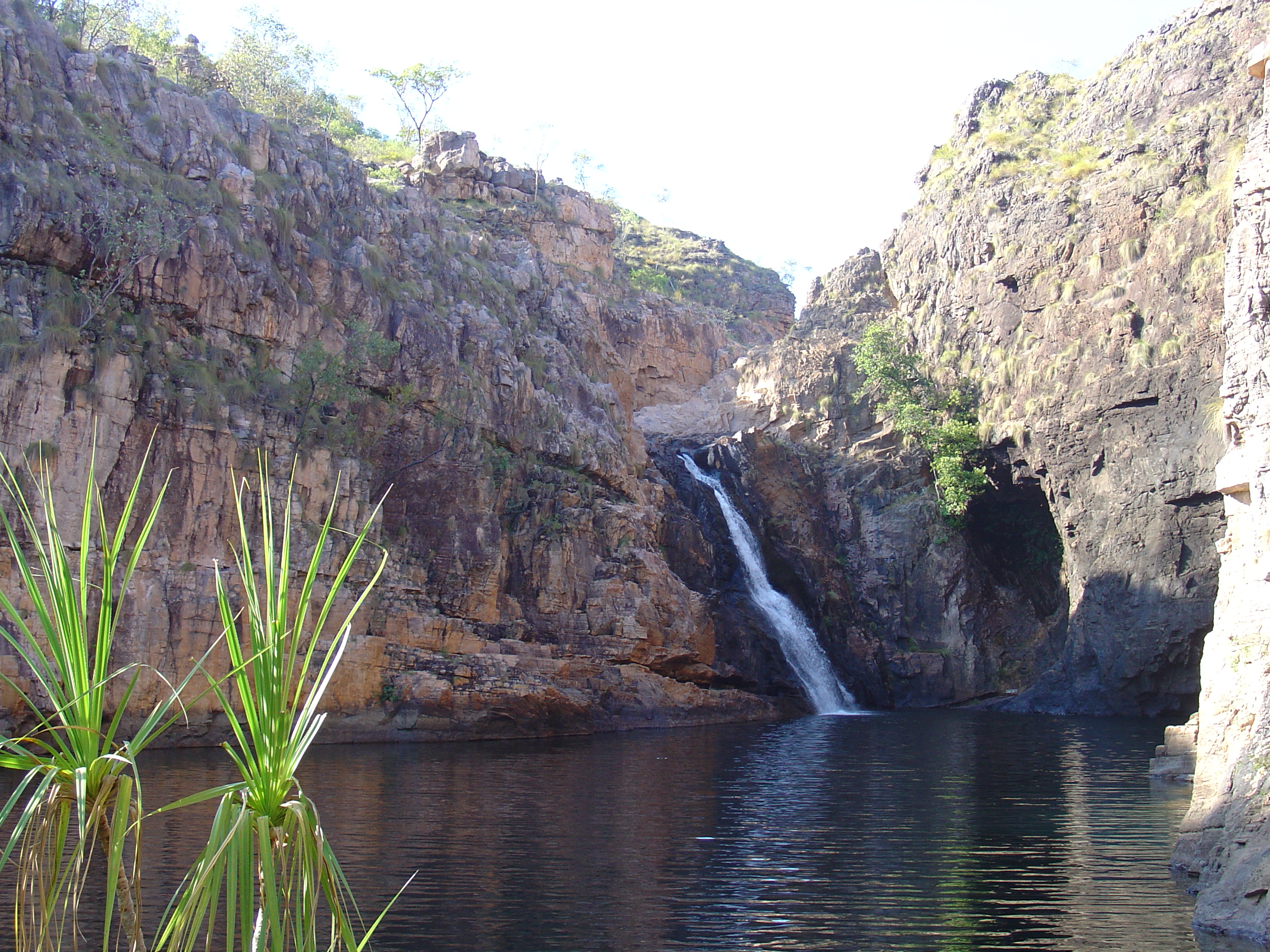
Maguk, also known as Barramundi Gorge, features a waterfall and plunge pool

Maguk is one of the only waterfalls in Kakadu that flows while there is no rain. Towards the end of the dry season however, the flow is much weaker than in the peak of the wet season.

== Facilities ==
- Car park
- Public Toilet

== See also ==
- Kakadu National Park
