= Lindsay Mollison =

Australian physician and environmentalist

Lindsay Clifford Mollison is a retired Consultant Physician in Gastroenterology and Infectious Diseases. He was the founding member of the Kakadu Action Group (KAG) that led a campaign to prevent mining in the Coronation Hill area of the Northern Territory's Kakadu National Park in the late 1980s and early 1990s.

== Early life and education ==
Mollison was born at St George's Hospital in Kew, Victoria in 1956. His father was a professional wood turner and his mother a shop assistant.

He was educated at Auburn Central School (now Auburn Primary School) and then Melbourne High School (where he was a prefect in his senior years at both). He graduated from school in 1974 with General and Special Exhibition Prizes in the Higher School Certificate examinations.

He then attended the University of Melbourne from 1975 to 1981 graduating with MBBS in that year. He was active in various non academic roles at University including being editor of the journal Speculum, and President of the Melbourne Medical School Students Association.

His early working professional life was in the Northern Territory based at Royal Darwin Hospital with rotations into Arnhem Land and the regions around Kakadu. Later he returned to Melbourne where he qualified as a Fellow of the Royal Australasian College of Physicians. It was during this period of studying that the mining threat to Kakadu became apparent and he began the KAG.

Subsequently he returned to the Northern Territory as a Consultant Physician for several years. In 1994 he moved with his family to Perth, Western Australia, to take up University Teaching Hospital posts.

== Kakadu Action Group ==
In the late 1980s the Australian Government was considering allowing gold mining by BHP in the Kakadu National Park at a site known as Coronation Hill.

Opposed to this plan was the Kakadu Action Group which met regularly in the Australian Conservation Foundation's offices in Glenferrie, Victoria. Australia. It was brought together by Mollison to oppose the proposed mine. To achieve this the group also organised and participated in various public meetings. It was being surveilled by the Australian Government with archives of its meetings still held secretly by the Government (due for release in 2026).

Influential letters from Mollison were published in the "To The Editor" section of the Melbourne Age newspaper. The themes were to protect the wilderness of the entire park for present and future generations from any further encroachment by mining interests and to recognise the links between these spaces and the Australian psyche.

== Professional life ==
During his time working in the Northern Territory Mollison researched First Nations Health and contributed to knowledge about it. In particular he discovered the importance of HTLV-I infection in central Australian First Nations people publishing the first reports of known disease associated with it in Australia and finding new links to common diseases afflicting these people due to infection with it. His groundbreaking insights and research has led to major efforts to further understand this disease in Australia although to date his work seems to have been under recognised.

During his working life in Western Australia, particularly at Fremantle Hospital, he helped to bring international trials of novel Hepatitis C medications to Australia and the State. Many of the drugs he and his team worked on are now mainstays of day to day therapies offering cures to patients with Hepatitis C.

He established a private Gastroenterology Practice and Hepatology Practice which continue to provide medical advice and therapies to the people of Western Australia (WA).

During his time in WA he completed a MPH at UWA. His team organised several international conferences on Hepatitis (the Annual Indian Ocean Hepatitis Meeting) during the early 2000s

Mollison became a snow sports Instructor in 2011 and has taught in Italy and Australia and has taken holiday groups skiing in France, Switzerland and Italy. He enjoys Bushwalking. He is a keen ocean swimmer and has achieved some ocean swimming milestones including the 20 km crossing of the Indian Ocean from Perth to Rottnest Island.

He has two adult children and numerous grandchildren.
