= Mimosa in Australia =

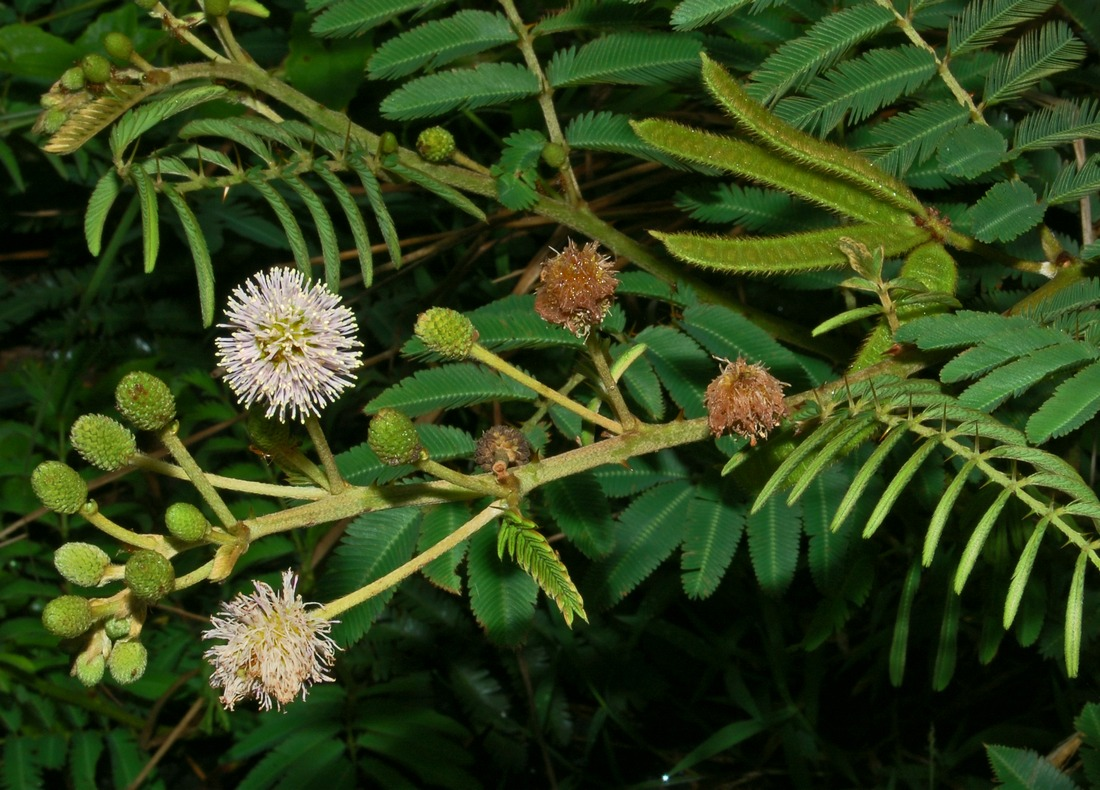
Mimosa pigra, leaves and inflorescence (photographed in Bogor, West Java, Indonesia).

In Australia, Mimosa pigra has been declared a noxious weed or given similar status under various weed or quarantine Acts. It has been ranked as the tenth most problematic weed and is listed on the Weeds of National Significance. It is currently restricted to the Northern Territory where it infests approximately 80,000 hectares of coastal floodplain.

Mimosa pigra invades sedgeland and grassland communities on open floodplains, particularly in areas where feral buffalo have removed the vegetation. It forms dense, practically monospecific tall shrubland in which the ground flora is sparse to non-existent. Similarly, it invades the paperbark (Melaleuca spp.) swamp forests fringing the floodplains, where it forms a dense understorey, and shades out native tree seedlings.

The common name is mimosa or giant sensitive plant. Other common names include: bashful plant, catclaw mimosa, black mimosa. Mimosa pigra can also be confused with Leucaena leucocephala (coffee bush), Aeschynomeme species and Sesbania species, but can be distinguished from these plants by its sensitive leaves, prickles and mauve flowers.

== History and distribution ==
Mimosa pigra was probably introduced into Australia at the Darwin Botanic Gardens in the 20 years prior to 1891, either accidentally in seed samples or as a curiosity, because of its sensitive leaves. Its spread around Darwin over the next 60 years was not particularly conspicuous, until a large infestation was discovered in 1952 at Adelaide River, 100 km south of Darwin. By 1968, it had spread downstream on the Adelaide River to the Marrakai Crossing, and by 1975 had reached the Arnhem Highway bridge. The plant was then well placed to take over the vast floodplains of the Adelaide River. Being low in palatability, it was assisted in establishment by high densities of feral water buffalo, which were heavily overgrazing the floodplains. Moreover, its seed can float, which aided its rapid spread. The population increased dramatically. During the early to mid 1980s, other rivers were colonized, but the rate of establishment has slowed since the late 1980s.

Since the 1950s, Mimosa pigra has spread to some of the main river systems in the Top End. It is currently present as far as the Victoria River in the west and the Phelp River (in Arnhem Land) in the east. A mimosa outbreak was discovered near Proserpine, Queensland in February 2001.

In the late 1960s, small infestations of Mimosa pigra were identified along the banks of the Adelaide River in the Northern Territory, Australia. Action was taken by the N.T. Agriculture Branch to exterminate it by spraying with Tordon, which was promising to achieve eradication until the N.T government discontinued the work allowing the weed to spread widely and become the N.T's and possibly Australia's worst weed problem.

== Importance ==
=== Detrimental ===
Mimosa pigra is a noxious weed, which has received international recognition because of its existing and potential impact on biological diversity. In Australia it further affects traditional and non-traditional land use, and the sustainability of agriculture and tourism.
Currently, Mimosa pigra has replaced over 80,000 hectares of native vegetation on wetlands in northern Australia. It was further found that Mimosa pigra thickets had fewer birds and lizards, less herbaceous vegetation, and fewer tree seedlings than the native vegetation. Furthermore, it is also probable that the magpie goose (Anseranas semipalmata (Latham)) is endangered by the spread of this weed, since it needs dense stands of native sedges for nesting and food. Conversely, the rare marsupial mouse Sminthopsis virginiae (Tarragon) had become more abundant as a result of Mimosa pigra. It is probable that other species have been affected as well.
Traditional methods of food-gathering by Aborigines are threatened by the weed through its effects on the fauna and flora of the wetlands, which are otherwise rich in traditional food such as fish, turtles and water birds. Sacred sites and sites of cultural significance have also been affected.
The dense thickets, by competing with pastures, hindering mustering, and preventing access to water, are a threat to pastoral industries, particularly the buffalo industry, in Australia. Hence, Mimosa pigra affects the pastoral industry through reduced grazing and water resources and increased difficulties in stock management, infrastructure maintenance and feral animal control. Tourism is also affected through reduced area and access for tourism activities, reduced wildlife attractions and reduced access to fishing, hunting and scenic areas.

=== Beneficial ===
Despite its detrimental impacts, Mimosa pigra does have uses. It has been of botanical interest since the 19th century, which led to its introduction and cultivation in botanic gardens outside of its native range. Mimosa fixes nitrogen and, in areas of Australia where it grows profusely, it increases soil fertility and redistributes nutrients from the lower soil profile to the surface. This may be beneficial for establishing vegetation after clearing Mimosa. It is used for firewood, bean-poles and as temporary fences, and has been tested as a medium for growing mushrooms. The harvest of Mimosa to extract vegetable tannins and to provide biomass to generate electricity has been proposed under controlled conditions.

== Control ==
Effective control of Mimosa has been difficult because of the extent of infestations, the aggressive nature of the plant and the type of terrain where it occurs.

=== Fire ===
Because of its little grassy understorey in thickets of Mimosa pigra, it is difficult to destroy infestations with fire. Burning does not prevent resprouting of plants and kills only surface seeds, not buried ones. It may stimulate seed germination due to the removal of seed coats. Mimosa pigra seedlings are susceptible to competition from grasses. Hence, Miller has argued that by using herbicides to open the canopy and allow herbaceous vegetation to regrow, fire can then be employed to clear infested areas, with subsequent sowing of competitive pasture species to suppress regeneration from seed.

=== Chemical control ===
Herbicides are widely used to control Mimosa, especially in Australia. Herbicide should be applied during the active period of growth of the mimosa and before any seed mature (which in Australia is during the wet season). The height and density of Mimosa may hinder access, resulting in the need for aerial spraying. However, this increases the risk posed by herbicide drift to non-target plants in the vicinity.

=== Biological control ===
It is recognized that biological control would be the most cost-effective and long-term control method for Mimosa pigra. Over the last 19 years, 11 insect and 2 fungal species have been released as biological control agents against mimosa. Six biological control agents are currently established on mimosa in Australia: the twig and stem-mining moths Neurostrota gunniella Busck and Carmenta mimosa Eichlin & Passoa cause stem and branch death and induce leaf-drop (both were first released in 1989), the flower-weevil Coelocephalapion pigrae Kissinger (released in 1994), and the seed-feeding bruchid Acanthoscelides puniceus Johnson (released in 1983) are relatively widespread. Chlamisus mimosae Karren, a leaf-feeding chrysomelid that was released in 1985 only established on the Finniss River catchment where it inflicts minor damage. The chrysomelid, Malacorhinus irregularis Jacoby, first released in 2000, was released at Beatrice Lagoon in 2001 and established there during the course of recent research Three species have only recently been released, the leaf-feeding looper, Macaria pallidata Warren, first released in July 2002, and the two seed-feeding weevils, Chalcodermus serripes Fahraeus and Sibinia fastigiata Clark. Although the latter were, respectively, first released in 1996 and 1997, difficulties mass-rearing these species prevented large-scale field releases from being made until more recently.
Four species have apparently failed to establish and/or persist: both pathogens, Phloeospora mimosae-pigrae Evans and Carion and Diabole cubensis (Arthur & J.R. Johnst.); the flower-feeding beetle Coelocephalapion aculeatum Fall; and the seed-feeding bruchid Acanthoscelides quadridentatus Schaeffer.

In the long term biocontrol on its own offers the only cost-effective control option for treating very large infestations of mimosa because of the high costs of chemicals, machinery and labour. However, the present biocontrol agents are very slow acting and may provide effective control only after several decades. If more rapid treatment is required, biocontrol should be used in conjunction with mechanical and chemical methods as part of an integrated management plan.

== See also ==
- Invasive species in Australia
