= Nabarlek (disambiguation) =

Nabarlek (Petrogale concinna) is a small species of macropod.

Nabarlek may also refer to:

- Nabarlek (band), an Indigenous Roots band
- Nabarlek Uranium Mine, an abandoned mine in the Northern Territory of Australia
