= 1989 Queen's Birthday Honours (Australia) =

The 1989 Queen's Birthday Honours for Australia were announced on Monday 12 June 1989 by the office of the Governor-General.

The Birthday Honours were appointments by some of the 16 Commonwealth realms of Queen Elizabeth II to various orders and honours to reward and highlight good works by citizens of those countries. The Birthday Honours were, at the time, awarded as part of the Queen's Official Birthday celebrations during the month of June.

== Order of Australia ==
=== Companion (AC) ===
==== General Division ====
Recipient	Citation	Notes
Dame Mary Durack, DBE	For service to the community and literature	
The Honourable Mr Justice Russell Walter Fox	For service to the law and to government	
Albert Edward Harris, AO	For service to the community	
Professor Priscilla Sheath Kincaid-Smith, CBE	For service to medicine, particularly in the field of nephrology	
The Honourable Justice Michael Hudson McHugh, QC	For service to the law	
Elisabeth Joy Murdoch, DBE	For service to the community	
Sir Gustav Joseph Victor Nossal, CBE	For service to medicine, to science and to the community	
The Honourable Sir Laurence Whistler Street, KCMG QC	For service to the law and to the Crown	
Kenneth Wilberforce Tribe, AO	For service to the arts, particularly in the field of music	

==== Military Division ====
Branch	Recipient	Citation	Notes
Navy	Vice Admiral Ian Warren Knox, AO	For service to the Australian Defence Force as Vice Chief of the Defence Force	
Army	Lieutenant General Lawrence George O'Donnell, AO	For service to the Australian Army as Chief of the General Staff	
Air Force	Air Marshal Raymond George Funnell, AO	For service to the Royal Australian Air Force as Chief of the Air Staff	

=== Officer (AO) ===
==== General Division ====
Recipient	Citation	Notes
Edward William Francis Bacon, CBE	For service to the community, particularly in the field of migrant assistance	
Willoughby James Bailey	For service to business and commerce, particularly in the field of banking	
Patrick Brazil	For service to the Public Service as Secretary to the Attorney-General's Department	
Dr John Ewart Cawte	For services to the Aboriginal community and psychiatry	
Professor Malcolm Chaikin, OBE	For services to education, particularly in the field of technological science	
Leonard Gordon Darling, CMG	For service to art, particularly through the Australian National Gallery, and to the community	
Rodney Disney Davidson, OBE	For service to conservation, particularly through the National Trust of Australia	
Norman Seymour Davidson	For service to primary industry and to the agricultural show movement	
Dr Ralph Leonard Doherty	For service to medicine, particularly in the fields of research, education and administration	
Robert Edwards	For service to conservation and the environment, particularly through museum organisations	
The Honourable Paul Anthony Edward Everingham	For service to government and politics and to the Northern Territory Legislative Assembly	
Maxwell Henley Harris	For service to literature	
Dr Stuart Francis Harris	For public service, particularly as Secretary to the Department of Foreign Affairs	
Gwendoline Nessie Harwood	For service to literature, particularly as a poet and librettist	
William Hubert Hayes, AM	For service to the community	
Dr Katie D Helms	For service to agricultural research	
Rosina Johnston	For service to nursing and to international relations	
Ian Patrick Kennedy	For service to the meat industry	
Sir Richard Kingsland, CBE DFC	For service to the community	
Isi Joseph Leibler, CBE	For service to the Jewish community	
Alastair MacLaurin Mackerras	For service to education	
Donald Gordon Macleish	For service to medicine, particularly through the teaching and development of vascular surgery	
Professor Margaret Mary Manion	For service to education and to the arts	
The Honourable Justice Brian Frank Martin, MBE QC	For service to the community	
Wendy Elizabeth McCarthy	For service to the community, particularly women's affairs and to the Australian Bicentennial celebrations	
Kenneth Gordon McCracken	For service to space science and technology	
Emeritus Professor James Russell McWilliam	For service to science and technology, particularly in the field of agricultural research	
June Yvonne Mendoza	For service to the visual arts	
Dr Stephen Charles Milazzo	For service to medicine, particularly in the field of rheumatic and arthritic diseases	
John David Newcombe, OBE	For service to the community, particularly to youth and to those with physical disabilities	
Dr Keith Norrish	For service to mining and agriculture, particularly through the use of x-ray fluorescence spectrometry	
His Honour Judge Harold George Ogden	For service to legal education	
Kevin Horace Parker, RFD QC	For public service, particularly as Solicitor-General of Western Australia	
Sister Mary Dulcie Reardon	For service to education	
The Honourable Dr Ian Gordon Sharp	For public service, particularly in the field of industrial relations	
Dr Anne Fairhurst Summers	For service to journalism and to women's affairs	
Patrick Nicol Troy	For service to education and to urban and regional development	
Edwin Gerhard Tscharke, MBE	For service to medical administration	
Kenneth Douglas Williams, AM	For service to business and commerce and to the community	
Cecil Wallace Edgar Williams	For service to industrial relations through the trade union movement	
Alan Keveral Cumming Newton Wrigley	For public service, particularly as Director General of the Australian Security Intelligence Organisation	

==== Military Division ====
Branch	Recipient	Citation	Notes
Navy	Rear Admiral Alan Lee Beaumont, AM	For service to the Royal Australian Navy, particularly as Director of Naval Plans	
Navy	Rear Admiral Owen John Hughes, AM	For service to the Royal Australian Navy, particularly as the Submarine Project Director	
Army	Major General Ross Stuart Buchan	For service to the Australian Army as General Officer Commander Training Command	
Army	Major General Barry Nigel Nunn	For service to the Army Reserve	
Air Force	Air Commodore John William Mitchell	For service to the Royal Australian Air Force as Commander Air Lift Group	
Air Force	Air Vice-Marshal Alan Raymond Reed	For service to the Royal Australian Air Force as Air Officer Commanding, Support Command	

=== Member (AM) ===
==== General Division ====
Recipient	Citation	Notes
Julie Moncrief Anthony, OBE	For service to the performing arts and to the community	
Attilio John Antico	For service to business and industry, particularly horticulture	
Professor Manuel James Aroney, OBE	For service to the Greek community and multicultural relations	
Neil Clifford Ashdown	For service to the community and to the arts	
Carmel Benjamin	For service to the community, particularly through social welfare organisations	
Dr William Roderick Blevin	For service to science, particularly in the field of applied physics	
Thomas Crampton Blue, BEM	For service to sports administration through the Olympic Federation of Australia	
Geoffrey Marcus Brash	For service to the community and retail business	
Kenneth Gethley Brooks	For service to education, particularly adult education	
John Charles Brown	For service to the wine industry	
Captain Doreen Brunt	For service to the community, particularly through youth counselling	
Captain David Brunt	For service to the community, particularly through youth counselling	
Leonard Edmund Buck	For service to the community, particularly through social welfare organisations	
Cicely Marion Joyce Bungey	For service to women's affairs in rural areas	
Francis Reginald Burgess	For service to automative engineering	
Dr Alan Durmergue Charters	For service to medicine and medical education	
Jennifer Cheesman	For service to the sport of basketball	
John Dowling Coates	For service to the sport of rowing	
Neville Leonard Colbran	For service to the law and the community	
Ernest Terence Colhoun	For service to music and radio and to the community	
Dr Robert Malcolm Cook	For service to dentistry and to maxillo-facial surgery	
Dr Victor James Couch	For service to education	
Associate Professor Graham De Vahl Davis	For service to the Jewish community	
John Thomas Devitt	For service to swimming and to sports administration	
Vivian Richard Ebsary	For service to biomedical engineering	
The Honourable Cyril Thomas Edmunds	For service to the Victorian Parliament and to the community	
Dr Mohamad Ali El Erian	For service to the Islamic community	
David Lindsay Elsum	For service to commerce and business	
Noel Ferrier	For service to the performing arts	
Ronald David Fitch	For service to industrial relations, to commercial arbitration and to architecture	
Michael Andrew Fitzgerald	For service to arts administration and to children's and young people's theatre	
Michael Francis Fletcher	For service to the sport of yachting	
Dr Brian James Fotheringham	For service to medical administration, to St John Ambulance and to child safety	
Dr Shirley Estelle Freeman	For public service	
Reginald William Gasnier	For service to rugby league football	
Joseph Salem Gazal	For service to business and commerce and to the Lebanese community	
Brendan Michael Hannelly	For service to the computer industry and to youth education	
The Honourable John Joseph Harman	For service to the community, particularly through the Australian Bicentennial celebrations	
Gaye Rosemary Hart	For service to the community, particularly through the Australian Bicentennial celebrations	
Colin Michael Hill	For service to conservation and to the community	
Bruce Huggett	For public service	
Yvonne Denise Kenny	For service to the opera	
Raymond John Kidney	For service to the community, particularly through social welfare organisations	
Dr Marcus James Killingback	For service to medicine, particularly in the field of colorectal surgery	
Anita Kay Lawrence	For service to the arts, particularly as designer of the Parliament House embroidery	
Arthur Geoffrey Lee, OAM	For service to scouting and to the community	
Frank Alfred Moorman Lees	For service to education and to research liaison with industry	
Robert Brook Lewis	For service to the community	
Dr Rex John Lipman, ED	For service to the banking industry and to the thoroughbred horse industry	
Margaret Elizabeth Lyttle	For service to education	
Dr Ian John Mackie	For service to surf life saving	
Father Robert John Thomas Maguire, RFD	For service to homeless youth through the Open Family Foundation	
Robert Brooker Maher	For service to the community, particularly through the Australian Bicentennial celebrations	
Claude Anthony Martin	For service to the flour milling industry and to the welfare of children	
Patrick Vowles Mayes	For service to the community, particularly through the Australian Bicentennial celebrations	
Dr Robert James Furlong McInerney, CMG	For service to medicine, particularly in the fields of obstetrics and gynaecology, and to sports medicine	
Neil Donald McInnes	For public service	
John Maurice McKim	For service to the community	
William David Mitchell	For service to primary industry, particularly fisheries and dairying	
John Gordon Morrison	For service to literature	
Beverley Margaret Moyes	For service to the community	
Colonel Lawrence James Newell, QPM ED RI	For service to the community, particularly in the field of emergency services	
Gerald Joseph O'Byrne	For service to the finance industry, particularly the credit union movement	
James Joseph O'Connor	For service to the thoroughbred horse breeding industry	
Elisabeth Nancy Owles	For service to community health as a dietitian	
Nita Veronica Pannell, OBE	For service to the performing arts	
Barbara Tweed Payne, OBE	For service to the community, particularly through the Australian Bicentennial celebrations	
Victor Bruce Perkins	For service to the transport industry, particularly shipping	
Raymond Owen Powys	For service to business and commerce, particularly in the field of property management	
Professor Michael Albert Edward Rex	For service to veterinary science	
Ronald Gordon Roach	For service to tourism and to the community	
Peter Ross-Edwards MLA	For service to politics and to the Victorian Parliament and to the community	
James Doric Rump	For service to the manufacturing industry and for public service	
Ian Murray Russell, OBE	For service to the community, particularly through the Australian Bicentennial celebrations	
Sister Mary Tarcissius Ryan	For service to nursing and hospital administration	
Dr Joachim Schneeweiss	For service to the community, particularly the Jewish community	
John Mervyn Shaw	For service to commerce, particularly the gas and fuel industry	
Dr Stuart John Hunt Shepherd	For service to geriatric medicine	
Earle John Smith	For service to surf life saving	
John Daniel Smith	For service to the trade union movement	
Patricia Josephine Smith	For service to women's lawn bowls	
John Kenrick Staveley	For service to commerce, particularly the insurance industry	
Professor Noel Levin Svensson	For service to people with disabilities, particularly through rehabilitation engineering	
Dr John David Swale	For service to music	
Howard Hamilton Taylor	For service to the visual arts	
Professor James Miln Thomson	For service to education and to marine science	
Margaret Ellen Throsby	For service to radio broadcasting	
Andonis (Tony) Toumbourou	For service to the Cypriot community	
Leonard Cecil Townsend	For service to the trade union movement	
Keith Leonard Turley	For service to the building and construction industry and to housing for the aged	
Janet Dianne Vernon	For service to the performing arts	
Dr Lesley Vincent	For service to people with physical disabilities	
Leslie Trethowan Whitcroft	For service to the community, particularly through service organisations	
The Honourable Frank Noel Wilkes	For service to government and politics and to the Victorian Parliament	
Daryl Robert Williams, QC	For service to the legal profession	
James Philip Yonge	For service to the banking industry	
Dr John Samuel Yu	For service to medicine, as a paediatrician and hospital administrator	

==== Military Division ====
Branch	Recipient	Citation	Notes
Navy	Lieutenant Detlef Rudolf Friedel Hase	For service to the Royal Australian Navy as Staff Officer (Discipline) in the Directorate of Naval Legal Services	
Navy	Commander John Scott Moore	For service in the Royal Australian Navy and as Master Attendant, particularly during the Bicentennial Naval Salute	
Navy	Commodore Rodney Graham Taylor	For service to the Royal Australian Navy and as Deputy Fleet Commander and Commodore Flotillas	
Navy	Commander Francois Robert van der Berg	For service to the Royal Australian Navy as Staff Officer Operations in the Directorate of Naval Intelligence and Security	
Army	Major Peter John Buckney	For service to the Australian Army in the field of logistics	
Army	Lieutenant Colonel Colin John Carting	For service to the Australian Army in the field of personnel management	
Army	Brigadier Geoffrey John Christopherson	For service to the Defence Force as Director General of Movement and Transport	
Army	Colonel Anthony John McGee	For service to the Australian Army as the Director of the Bicentennial Military Tattoo 1988	
Army	Lieutenant Colonel Terrence John Nolan	For service to the Australian Army as Commanding Officer Special Air Service Regiment	
Army	Captain Christopher Fancourt Parkinson	For service to the Australian Army as Technical Survey Adviser – Vanuatu	
Army	Lieutenant Colonel Brian Lawrence Vale	For distinguished performance of duty as Commanding Officer of the School of Army Health	
Army	Lieutenant Colonel Lyall Alan Wood, RFD	For service to the Australian Army as the Commanding Officer of 2nd/17th Battalion the Royal New South Wales Regiment	
Air Force	Wing Commander Peter Arthur Allen	For service to the Royal Australian Air Force as the Commanding Officer, RAAF Museum	
Air Force	Squadron Leader Graeme John Baesjou	For service to the Royal Australian Air Force as the Detachment Commander and Senior Administrative Officer during the development of the RAAF Base, Tindal	
Air Force	Squadron Leader Mark Donald Binskin	For service to the Royal Australian Air Force as an F/A-18 display pilot and the No 77 Squadron Fighter Combat Instructor	
Air Force	Wing Commander Frederick William Eske	For service to the Royal Australian Air Force as the project engineer for the RAAF S-70A-9 Black Hawk Helicopter Project	
Air Force	Air Commodore Roger Francis Lowery	For service to the Royal Australian Air Force as Flying Display Director for the Australian Bicentennial Air Show	

=== Medal (OAM) ===
==== General Division ====
Recipient	Citation	Notes
Dennis Hill Adams	For service to the community as a military artist	
Shirley Margaret Adams	For service to the Girl Guides and to local government	
Brian John Aherne	For service to the community, particularly through the Australian Bicentennial celebrations	
Keith Lewis Alcock	For services to golf	
William Henry Allen	For service to the community	
Archie Frederick Arbuckle	For service to the veterans and to people with visual impairments	
Catherine Elizabeth Archer	For service to hockey	
Duncan John D'Arcy Armstrong	For service to swimming	
Joseph Bernard Arrowsmith	For service to the visual arts	
Colin Keith Atkins	For service to regional planning and the community	
Sydney Richard Bagley	For service to the craft of stonemasonry and to the training of young people	
Vernon Leslie Bailey	For service to the community and local government	
Maxwell Rae Barry	For service to the community and technical education	
Denis Charles Bartell	For service to the community	
Harold William Bartlett	For service to the community	
Kenneth Leslie Bayly	For service to scouting	
Cecil Elias Baz	For service to the community	
Stanley Beacroft	For service to the community, particularly through the St Vincent de Paul Society	
Tracey Lee Belbin	For service to the sport of hockey	
Coral Bennett	For service to the community and conservation	
Kathleen Isobel Bensley	For service to the community	
David Wayne Beresford	For service to veterans	
Ermes Michael Bergagna	For service to the Italian community	
Kevin Francis Betts	For service to people with physical disabilities	
Reginald Thomas Biggs	For service to the community	
Frances Rita Bisby	For service to the community and the Girl Guides	
Noel Thomas Bodycoat	For service to the community and education	
Kevin Wilfred Booth	For service to the community and music	
The Reverend Anthony Boylan	For service to children as chaplain to the Adelaide Children's Hospital	
James Bradley	For service to surf life saving	
Leona Muriel Lillian Bradley	For service to the community, particularly women's affairs	
The Reverend Father Arthur Ernest Bridge	For service to youth as co-ordinator of the Hunter Life Education Centre	
Charles Wallis Bright	For service to the Dalwood Children's Home	
William Norman Ronald Brisbane	For service to the community and scouting	
Paul Edgar Buddee	For service to music, to children and to literature	
John Howard Burgess	For service to the community and local government	
Denise Marie Burgess	For service to the community	
Ellis Christian Butt	For service to the community and local government	
Geoffrey Watson Canaway	For service to the visually impaired	
Lee Anne Capes	For service to the sport of hockey	
Michelle Edith Capes	For service to the sport of hockey	
Sally May Carbon	For service to the sport of hockey	
David Reginald Chandler	For services to the building industry	
Ernest William Chapman	For service to the sport of rowing and to the community	
Montague Gerald Chatfield	For service to the sport of tennis	
Yung Kil Choi	For service to the Korean community	
Bernard Neil Clarke	For service to conservation	
Elspeth Catherine Clement	For service to the sport of hockey	
Lynette Rae Clyde	For service to the community and nursing	
Leslie Thomas Cooper	For service to the community and local government	
Eustace Henry Cope	For service to the citrus growing industry	
Derrick Charles Frances Corser	For service to the community, particularly the elderly	
Stanley Alfred Coster	For service to country music	
Hazel Clarice Cotterill	For service to terminally ill and disables children	
Colin James Henry Crain	For service to the community, particularly in the field of education	
Sydney Arthur Cunningham	For service to the Aboriginal community	
Laurance Alexander Daglish	For service to the elderly and to sport	
Ivan Henry Davies, DFC	For service to Legacy	
Robert Arthur Lewis Dawe	For service to music	
John Osbourne Dexter	For service to the avocado and kiwifruit growing industry	
Thomas Michael Dignam	For service to the community	
Hermanna Maria Bernardina Dobber	For service to the community, particularly women's affairs	
Councillor Neville Fraser Duncan Donald	For service to the community and local government	
Margaret Ann Donald	For service to the community, particularly through music therapy	
Reginald Paul Donnelly	For service to the community	
Loretta Eileen Dorman	For service to the sport of hockey	
Mary Elizabeth Dossetor	For service to the elderly and the physically disabled	
Maureen Doupe	For service to children with intellectual disabilities	
Margery Duffy	For service to youth through music	
Violet Claudia Mary Duncan	For service to the community	
Ian Charles Edwards	For service as a physiotherapist in Kabul, Afghanistan	
William Ernest Elliott	For service to the sport of Australian rules football	
Nicholas Elias Ellis	For service to the Greek community	
Gregory Patrick Farrell	For service to the transport industry and to the community	
Jean Kinkead Ferguson	For service to early childhood education	
Herbert Alfred Fibbins	For service to the sport of hockey	
Peter Charles Firkins	For service to the community	
Maree Beverley Fish	For service to the sport of hockey	
Councillor Stanley Hill Flanders	For service to the community and to local government	
Dorothy Fraser	For service to the community	
Harold Emanuel Freedman	For service to the visual arts	
Charles Freeleagus	For service to veterans	
Alma Annie French	For service to the community	
Wallace Freyling	For service to the Toowoomba General Hospital	
Marjorie Patricia Fuller	For service to the community	
Donald Alfred Furner	For service to the sport of rugby league	
Valerie Glennys Gaddes	For service to the community	
Gerard Timothy Noel Gaffney	For service to local government and to the community	
Sudershan Kumar Gajree	For service to photography	
Dorothy Phyllis Sylvia Gale	For service to the community	
Ronald Gallacher	For assistance to the Public Service	
David Gant	For service to people with intellectual disabilities	
Donald Blandford Gatehouse	For service to the community	
Garnet Leonard Gaukroger	For service to the community	
Agnes Darcey Gibbons	For service to people with physical disabilities	
Phyllis Doreen Gierke	For service to community health and to children with physical disabilities	
Elizabeth Monica Joan Gill	For service to the community	
Vivian Herbert Charles Gillingwater	For service to youth	
Stanley Cyril Glassford	For service to local government and to the community	
Raymond George Godkin	For servicing to cycling	
Frederick Harold Gray	For service to Aboriginal welfare	
Henry Moore Greaves	For service to the rural community, particularly through radio broadcasting	
Cynthia Lillian Gurner	For service to the community	
Arthur William Hadfield	For service to hospital administration	
Thomas Graham Hall	For service to sports administration	
Herbert Robert Hamblen	For service to community health	
George Allan Hardwick	For service to historical research, particularly in the field of maritime history	
Arthur Leslie Harper	For service to the community, particularly through marine safety	
John Hubert Harris	For service to Australian rules football and to the community	
Rechelle Margaret Hawkes	For service to hockey	
Anne Marie Hayden	For service to the community	
David Henderson	For service to the community	
William Goodman Kerray Henderson	For service to veterans	
John Lloyd Hewett	For service to optometry	
Councillor Henry Arthur Hewson	For service to local government and to the Victorian and Commonwealth parliaments	
Michael Thomas Higgins	For service to the community particularly in the field of migrant assistance	
Dorothy May Hill	For service to animal welfare and to the elderly	
Lorraine Mary Hillas	For service to hockey	
Winifred Margaret Hilliard, MBE	For service to Aboriginal welfare, particularly the Pitjantjatjara people	
Peter Samuel Hilton	For service to the community particularly the migrant community	
Geoffrey John Hitchcock	For service to children's health	
Frank Leslie Hodgson	For service to youth and architecture	
Harold Maxwell Hodgson	For service to the community, particularly in the field of youth welfare	
Gladys Isobel Holland	For service to the community	
The Reverend Keith Douglas Horne	For service to the community	
Thomas Stanislaus Howard	For service to the community	
Nancy Millicent Hummerston	For service to the community	
Lilian Blanche Huntington	For service to women's lawn bowls	
Donald Mervyn Hutchison	For service to the real estate industry and to the community	
Ludwik Ihnat	For service to the Ukrainian community	
William Dubois Jensen	For service to the community	
Phyllis Sarah Johnson	For service to women's affairs and consumer rights	
Ruth Cecilia Keane	For service to the community	
Stephen Dixon Keir	For service to manufacturing and to horse racing	
Richard Milton Kett	For service to the elderly	
James Alec Kidd	For service to horticulture	
Bernard Francis Kilgariff	For service to the Northern Territory and Commonwealth Parliaments	
Katherine Wilma Kingsbury	For service to community and health welfare	
Matthew Miklos Kiss	For service to people with disabilities	
Air Commodore Lyall Robert Klaffer, AFC (rtd)	For service to the community, particularly through the Australian Bicentennial celebrations	
Ray William Kratz	For service to horticulture and to local government	
Gordon James Landsberg	For service to the community	
John James Larkin	For service to pasture conservation and to the community	
Keith John Leleu	For service to maritime history and preservation	
Harold Robert Lee	For service to veterans and to the community	
Robert Dudley Leonard, BEM	For service to the community, particularly to veterans and to the arts	
Reginald John Lindsay	For service to country music	
Diane Margaret Lippe	For service to nursing, particularly people with physical disabilities	
Thomas Locker	For service to cricket and to the community	
Barbara Elsie Lofts	For service to community health	
Marjorie Maude Long	For service to the community	
Sergeant Clifford Donald Lonsdale	For public service with the New South Wales Police Force	
Betty Claire Lynch	For service to community health as a dietician	
Bernard Marcus	For public service	
Dr Mark Milutin Marinkovich	For service to the Serbian community	
Thomas James Marsh	For service to veterans and to the community	
Elsie Marsh	For service to the community, particularly through the Australian Red Cross	
Mervyn John Mason	For service to local government and to the community	
Robert Lyall Matchett, RD	For service to community education and to youth	
Francis Bernard Matthews	For service to veterans and to the community	
James Patrick Matthews	For service to community health	
Donald Bruce Maxwell	For service to rugby union football	
Martin Bernhard Maywald	For service to the community	
Audrey June McDonald	For service to the trade union movement and to women's affairs	
Philomena McGrath	For service to migrants and to the Irish community	
Molly McGurk	For service to music education	
Neil William McInnes	For service to youth through church camps	
Ronald Frederick McKendrick	For service to the community	
Dr Keith Roland McLachlan	For service to local government and to the community	
Barbara Jean Meynink	For service to post secondary education	
Cyril Thomas Monaghan	For public service	
Philip John Morrissey	For service to the community, particularly through the Australian Bicentennial celebrations	
Joseph Patrick Morton	For service to scouting	
Dr Louis Georges Moussa	For service to the Lebanese community	
Wallace Edward Mulheron	For service to education	
John Leo Murphy	For service to the community health	
Evelyn Alexa Murray	For service to the community	
Catherine Margaret Murtagh	For public service with the Victoria Police Force	
Macgregor Boyd Napier	For service to athletics	
Ksenia Nasielski	For service to the community, particularly the elderly	
Emil Anthony Negri	For service to adults and to children with intellectual disabilities	
Bill Neidjie	For service to conservation	
Halina Jozefa Netzel	For service to the community, particularly the Polish community	
Lillian Mary Neville	For service to women's athletics	
John Alexander Nicol	For service to local government	
Stuart Norman Nivison	For service to horse racing	
Winsome Eileen O'Brien	For service to the community	
Patrick O'Leary	For public service	
Morris Stephen Ochert	For service to the Jewish community	
Joyce Elaine Oldmeadow	For service to children's literature	
Garth Francis (Garry) Ord	For service as a radio and television broadcaster	
Pauline Gladys Osborne	For service to the community	
Louis Raymond Page	For service to the community particularly through the Friendly Benevolent Society	
Kathleen Anne Partridge	For service to hockey	
Sharon Lee Patmore	For service to hockey	
David St. Leger Pearce	For service to the community	
Jaqueline Margaret Pereira	For service to hockey	
Margaret Isabel Ann Pewtress	For service to netball	
Hazel Mary Pierce	For service to the community	
Claud Joseph Pilcher	For service to the community	
Alison May Pilkie	For service to the community	
Sandra Jane Pisani	For service to hockey	
Dr John Drysdale Playford	For service to literature	
Albert Neil Preston	For public service	
Robert Alan Quin	For service to the community and to local government	
Schelte Raadsma	For public service	
Richard William Ragless	For service to the community	
The Reverend Father Francis Charles Richards	For service to the community	
John Charles Edgar Ridley	For service to the community	
James McIntosh Robertson	For service to golf administration	
Norman Herbert Robinson	For service to conservation and the environment	
Stanley Russell Robinson	For service to local government	
The Reverend Father John Bernard Roche	For service to religion, the community and to veterans	
Stoyan Rogleff	For service to Ku-ring-gai State Emergency Service and Civil Defence Organisation	
Dr Reno George Rossato	For service to medicine and to the community	
Edwin Keith Russack	For service to the community and to the South Australian Parliament	
Dr Charles Terence George Russell	For service to angling	
Peter John Sarah	For service to the community, particularly through the Australian Bicentennial celebrations	
Barry Lesley Saxby	For service to veterans	
Vincenzo Scurria	For service to the community	
John Kingsley Sharp	For service to special education, particularly for children with intellectual disabilities	
Douglas Andrew Simpson	For service to the community, particularly with the Country Fire Authority	
Ernest James Sims	For service to youth	
Jean Wren Slattery	For service to the Royal Horticultural Society of New South Wales, particularly in the field of floral art	
Kim Maree Small	For service to hockey	
Verna Margaret Smith	For service to pre-school education	
Philomena Mary Smyth	For service to nursing	
Alma Lilly Stackhouse	For service to the Aboriginal community	
Dr Beresford Hannam Stock	For service to pharmacy	
Dr Robert Story	For service to conservation and national parls	
Lawrence Lea Strange	For service to the community, particularly through the Australian Bicentennial celebrations	
Dugald Macarthur Stuart	For service to horse racing	
Keith William Stuckey	For service to local government	
Deborah Ann Sullivan	For service to hockey	
Dr Alexander Kennedy Sutherland	For service to veterinary science	
Theodore Arthur Taylor	For service to youth	
John Hartley Teakle	For service to primary industry	
Albert Arthur Tegel	For service to the poultry industry and to the community	
Henry Albert Hingston Thomas	For service to the community	
The Reverend Ivan Bruce Thornton	For service to the community	
Tjunkata Tjupurrula	For service to the community, particularly the Aboriginal community	
Elizabeth Todd	For service to music education	
Liane Marianne Tooth	For service to hockey	
Kathleen Tucker	For service to the community	
Dulcie Agnes Turnbull	For service to the community and to local government	
John Kendall Vaughan	For service to surf life saving	
Colin Venn	For service to the community	
John Maxwell Wall	For service to people with visual impairments	
Kathleen Wall	For service to the elderly	
Neville Robert Wallwork	For service to the community	
Stanley Bernard Dudley Walpole	For service to local government and to the community	
Patience Australie Wardle	For service to community history	
Raymond Hastings Warne	For service to the community	
Colin Watson	For service to conservation and bushwalking	
Raymond Wetherall	For service to the community	
Margaret Louisa Wheatley	For service to the community	
Dr Paul Hamilton Hume White	For service to religious welfare	
Douglas Croxford White	For service to local government and to the community	
James Norman Whittle	For service to scouting	
John Cornell Whittle	For service to the community and to veterans	
Dr David John Wibberley	For service to community health	
Christopher David Wilford	For service to the banana growing industry	
Councillor Alick Williams	For service to the community	
John Joseph Wilson	For service to rugby league football	
William Bryce Winfield	For service to the elderly	
The Reverend Gillam Albert McConnell Wood, OBE	For service to the elderly	
Dorothy Joan Woolnough	For service to nursing	
Eileen Mary Yeo	For service to the community	
Robert Young	For service to basketball	
Amy Merle Young	For service to the community, particularly through choral music	
Francis Patrick Zikan	For service to community emergency services	
John Robert Zwar	For service to the community through tree planting parkland development	
Dorothea Hedwig Zweck	For service to women's affairs	

==== Military Division ====
Branch	Recipient	Citation	Notes
Navy	Chief Petty Officer Geoffrey John Wade Abnett	For service to the Royal Australian Navy as Assistant Staff Officer (Personnel), Directorate of Naval Intelligence and Security	
Navy	Petty Officer Nola Frances Hanigan	For service to the Royal Australian Navy and as Personnel Officer at HMAS Platypus	
Navy	Warrant Officer Peter George Hassell	For service to the Royal Australian Navy as Fleet Legal Assistant	
Navy	Chief Petty Officer Patrick Eamon Marsh	For service to the Royal Australian Navy as Naval Support Command Ceremonial and Gunnery Chief Petty Officer	
Army	Warrant Officer Class Two Robert Bruce Allen	For service to the Australian Army as Operations Research Warrant Officer of the Special Air Service	
Army	Warrant Officer Class One John Alexander Beningfield	For service to the Australian Army in the field of accommodation and works	
Army	Warrant Officer Class One Bruce John Cook	For service to the Australian Army as Regimental Sergeant Major of the 21st Supply Battalion	
Army	Warrant Officer Class One Peter Ernest Dobbs	For service to the Australian Army as Regimental Sergeant Major 4th Field Regiment	
Army	Warrant Officer Class One Terence Allan Eaton	For service to the Australian Army School of Transport	
Army	Warrant Officer Class Two David Elliot	For service to the Australian Army in the field of piping music	
Army	Warrant Officer Class One Norman James Goodhew	For service to the Australian Army as the Artificer Sergeant Major of Perth Workshop Company	
Army	Warrant Officer Class One George Francis Kearns	For service to the Australian Army Reserve in Western Australia	
Army	Warrant Officer Class One Patrick Joseph Keily	For service to the Australian Army in project management	
Army	Warrant Officer Class Two Ross Kenneth Kershaw	For service to the Australian Army in the field of officer cadet training	
Army	Warrant Officer Class One Geoffrey Richard Parker	For service to the Australian Army in the field of training	
Army	Warrant Officer Class Two Iris Rose Preston	For service to the Australian Army in the field of movement and transportation	
Army	Warrant Officer Class Two John Malcolm Strachan	For service to the Australian Army in the field of Army Reserve recruiting	
Army	Warrant Officer Class One Louis Dawson Walker	For service to the Australian Army as the Regimental Sergeant Major of the 1st Armoured Regiment	
Air Force	Warrant Officer Robert Francis Carpenter	For service to the Royal Australian Air Force as Flight Engineer Leader, Richmond	
Air Force	Flight Sergeant Thomas Easton	For service to the Royal Australian Air Force as the Senior Non-Commissioned Officer responsible for the supervision of security arrangements associated with VIP movements at RAAF Fairbairn	
Air Force	Warrant Officer John Michael Jenkins	For service to the Royal Australian Air Force as Warrant Officer in charge of financial administration for project personnel located in North America	
Air Force	Sergeant Robert William Jennings	For service to the Royal Australian Air Force as the police dog handler responsible for designing an effective tactical training program for police dog handlers and their dogs	
Air Force	Flight Sergeant Allen Robert Meredith	For service to the Royal Australian Air Force as the Facilities Supervisor RAAF Base Pearce, Western Australia	
Air Force	Sergeant Christopher Cecil Parslow	For service to the Royal Australian Air Force as Senior Non-Commissioned Officer-in-Charge of Maintenance Control section at RAAF Base Tindal	
Air Force	Flight Sergeant Raymond Thomas Tuni	For service to the Royal Australian Air Force as Senior Non-Commissioned Officer-in-Charge of P3C Orion Aircraft Major Servicings	
Air Force	Warrant Officer Raymond Percival Willis	For service to the Royal Australian Air Force as the Caterer at RAAF Base Tindal	
