= Country (Indigenous Australians) =

Meaning of "country" for Indigenous Australians

The Indigenous peoples of Australia, which comprise Aboriginal Australians and the Torres Strait Islander people, have strong and complex relationships with the concept of "Country" (often capitalised). In this sense it does not refer to the modern-day nation of Australia, but rather different aspects of how the traditional lands of a particular Indigenous group affects their culture, the way of seeing the world, and interactions with other people.

== Background ==
Country has specific meaning for Aboriginal and Torres Strait Islander peoples. The Australian Institute of Aboriginal and Torres Strait Islander Studies describes this as:

"Country is the term often used by Aboriginal peoples to describe the lands, waterways and seas to which they are connected. The term contains complex ideas about law, place, custom, language, spiritual belief, cultural practice, material sustenance, family and identity".

The Dulabed Malanbarra Yidinji Aboriginal Corporation explain that when they speak of Country:

we mean much more than just the place we come from. Country is who we are and who we belong to. It is our relationship with other people and the world around us. A world where everything is connected, everything is family, everything is identity, our spirituality, our economy, our home and our people. Country makes us strong and keeps us well. People talk about Country in the same way they would talk about a person. They speak to Country, sing to Country, visit Country, worry about Country, feel sorry for Country and long for Country. People say that Country knows, hears, smells, takes notice and takes care. This is our Country. All aspects of it are of importance to us. All of it has spiritual meaning to us. The Country gives us our lore. The lore gives us our Country. Aboriginal people are governed by this lore.

== Country and identity ==
Margo Ngawa Neale, senior Indigenous art and history curator at the National Museum of Australia, and author of books explaining Indigenous knowledge, says:

Country is more than a view of landscape, it is a belief system and a worldview. For First Nations people, your identity is totally related to Country, your own Country where your particular clan comes from. We spell it with a capital C because it is not country as with Israel or America — it is not a surface thing, it is not cartographic. We see Country as a personage, as a living being It holds the wisdom and knowledge and all the features are the result of the ancestral beings who have travelled the country and created it.

Country is traditionally related to self-identity, and with relation to an individual, describes family origins and associations with particular parts of Australia. For example, a Gamilaraay man, whose traditional lands ("country") lies in south-west Queensland might refer to his country as "Gamilaraay country". Australian Aboriginal identity often links to their language groups and traditional country of their ancestors.

== Connection to Country ==
Land is of great significance to Aboriginal and Torres Strait Islander peoples, often expressed as "connection to Country". Country can be spoken about as if it is a person, and it implies an interdependent and reciprocal relationship between an individual and the lands and seas of their ancestors. The relationship is enhanced and sustained by the living environment and cultural knowledge. Because everything is connected, animals, trees, rocks, land and sky all deserve respect. Past is connected to present, and there is a sense it is important to acknowledge and respect the country of other peoples, wherever one travels in Australia. The term "on Country", or "on [a specific people] country" is often used. Connection to country, "the most fundamental pillar of Indigenous identity", is a difficult concept for non-Indigenous Australians to understand, and disconnection from country has been shown to have an impact on Indigenous peoples' health and well-being.

The connection to country is frequently expressed in Indigenous art. Bill Neidjie, Gaagudju elder, expressed that it is by “feeling” country that a person is "made" (exists). Palyku woman Ambelin Kwaymullina: "Country is filled with relations speaking language and following Law... Country is family, culture, identity. Country is self."

Aileen Moreton-Robinson, Professor of Indigenous Research at RMIT University, has written that the sense of belonging, home and place experienced by Indigenous peoples of Australia stands in sharp contrast to that of non-Indigenous peoples, many of whom descend from the original colonisers. According to her, white Australians' sense of belonging is "derived from ownership and achievement and is inextricably tied to a racialised social status...", and based on the persistence of the idea of terra nullius. The deep spiritual connection felt by Aboriginal Australians is related to their continuing occupation of the Australian continent for around 60,000 years, and the belief that Aboriginal lore/law was created by spirit ancestors to look after the land and its people. Songlines perform several functions, including mapping routes across the continent and passing on culture, and express connectedness to country.

== Caring for Country ==
"Caring for Country" is another term commonly used in an Indigenous context, defined as "participating in interrelated activities on Aboriginal lands and seas with the objective of promoting ecological, spiritual and human health". Caring for Country projects in operation across Australia involve collaborative partnerships between Indigenous and non-Indigenous people working to repair Indigenous lands and to preserve the environment using cultural knowledge.

Of Caring for Country, Neale says:

Caring for Country is more than cleaning waterholes. It is actually caring for it as you would your mother or your relative or any other person. You've got to care for it ancestrally, spiritually and every other way. When you perform a ceremony, the power of it goes into the ground. The songs you sing to Country and the stories you tell on Country animate and invigorate it, keeping it alive. You pay homage to the ancestors of that place.

== Welcome to Country ==
A Welcome to Country is a ritual or formal ceremony performed at many events held in Australia, intended to highlight the cultural significance of the surrounding area to a particular Aboriginal clan or language group who are recognised as traditional owners of the land.

Acknowledgement of Country is a recognition of the Indigenous or First Nations place or places on which a meeting is occurring. It is usually made by non-Indigenous people out of respect for the First Nations people who are traditional custodians of the land. The form of words is not critical, but Reconciliation Australia suggests some options including: I’d like to begin by acknowledging the Traditional Owners of the land on which we meet today. I would also like to pay my respects to Elders past and present.

In Australia, Acknowledgement of Country is frequently made in scientific articles and reports where work has been conducted on Country.

== See also ==
- Country (identity)
- National identity
