= Boronia verecunda =

Scientific classification
- Kingdom: Plantae
- Clade: Tracheophytes
- Clade: Angiosperms
- Clade: Eudicots
- Clade: Rosids
- Order: Sapindales
- Family: Rutaceae
- Genus: Boronia
- Species: B. verecunda

Binomial name
- Boronia verecunda Duretto
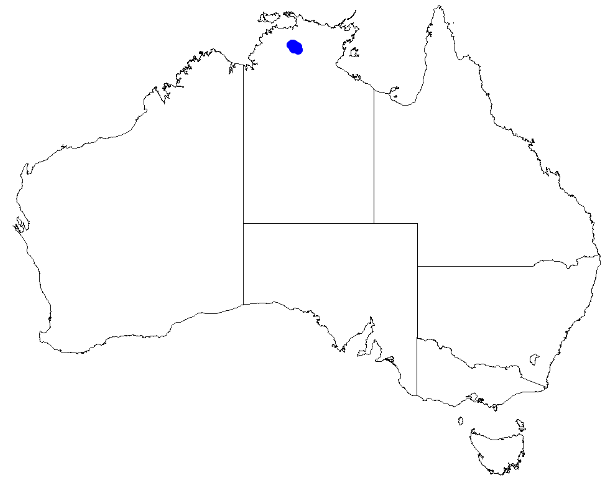
- Occurrence data from Australasian Virtual Herbarium

Species of flowering plant

Boronia verecunda is a species of small, erect shrub that is endemic to a small area in the Northern Territory. The flowers are borne singly in leaf axils and are white or pink but turn green as the fruit matures. It is similar to B. xanthastrum.

== Description ==
Boronia verecunda is an erect, much-branched shrub that typically grows to a height of about 40 cm (16 in). Its young branchlets are covered with a layer of light pink to white hairs but become glabrous as they age. Mature plants have narrow elliptical leaves that are 13–27 mm (0.51–1.06 in) long, 2–4 mm (0.079–0.157 in) wide on a petiole up to 1 mm (0.04 in) long and are more or less covered with a layer of white hairs. The flowers are borne singly in leaf axils on a hairy peduncle 0.5–1 mm (0.020–0.039 in) long. The sepals are egg-shaped to triangular, 6–7 mm (0.24–0.28 in) long, 1.5–3 mm (0.059–0.118 in) wide and turn green as they age. The petals are white or pink, about 3 mm (0.12 in) long and 2 mm (0.08 in) wide, turning green as they age. The sepals and petals do not enlarge significantly as the fruit develops. Flowering occurs from January to April and the fruit is a warty capsule about 5 mm (0.20 in) long and 4 mm (0.16 in) wide.

== Taxonomy and naming ==
Boronia verecunda was first formally described in 1997 by Marco F. Duretto who published the description in the journal Australian Systematic Botany. The specific epithet (verecunda) is derived from the Latin word verecundus meaning "modest and blushing", referring to the small size of the plant and the colour of the petals and hairs on new growth.

== Distribution and habitat ==
This boronia grows between sandstone rocks and on small scree slopes on sandstone escarpments near the South Alligator River in Kakadu National Park.

== Conservation status ==
This species is classified as "near threatened" under the Territory Parks and Wildlife Conservation Act 2000.
