= Acacia filipes =

Scientific classification
- Kingdom: Plantae
- Clade: Tracheophytes
- Clade: Angiosperms
- Clade: Eudicots
- Clade: Rosids
- Order: Fabales
- Family: Fabaceae
- Subfamily: Caesalpinioideae
- Clade: Mimosoid clade
- Genus: Acacia
- Species: A. filipes

Binomial name
- Acacia filipes Pedley

Synonyms
- Racosperma filipes (Pedley) Pedley

Species of legume

Acacia filipes is a species of flowering plant in the family Fabaceae and is endemic to the Northern Territory of Australia. It is a spreading shrub with smooth stems, slender ribbed branchlets, glabrous, terete phyllodes, spikes of yellow flowers and flat, linear pods.

== Description ==
Acacia filipes is spreading shrub that typically grows to a height of 1 metre (3 ft) and a width of around 2 m (6 ft 7 in). It has slender, angular branchlets that are ribbed and resinous. Its phyllodes are glabrous, 85–150 mm (3.3–5.9 in) long and 0.4–0.8 mm (0.016–0.031 in) in diameter with a short point on the end, eight parallel, longitudinal veins and a gland up to 5 mm (0.20 in) from the base of the phyllode. The flowers are borne in two spikes 10–25 mm (0.39–0.98 in) long on a slender peduncle 10–45 mm (0.39–1.77 in) long in axils. Flowering has been observed in February and the pods are flat, linear, 4.0–4.5 mm (0.16–0.18 in) long and 2–3 mm (0.079–0.118 in) wide, slightly resinous and woody. The seeds are dark grey, about 3 mm (0.12 in) long and 1.5 mm (0.059 in) wide with a cup-shaped aril.

== Taxonomy ==
Acacia filipes was first formally described in 1999 by Leslie Pedley in the journal Austrobaileya from specimens collected 21 km (13 mi) north of Jim Jim Falls, near the entrance to Deaf Adder Gorge in the Northern Territory.The specific epithet (filipes) means 'thread-foot', and alludes to the shape of the peduncles.

== Distribution and habitat ==
This species of wattle is native to a near Deaf Adder Gorge in Kakadu National Park in the Northern Territory where it grows on top of sandstone escarpments.

== Conservation status ==
Acacia filipes is listed as of "least concern", under the Northern Territory Government Territory Parks and Wildlife Conservation Act.

== See also ==
- List of Acacia species
