= Acacia arafurica =

Scientific classification
- Kingdom: Plantae
- Clade: Tracheophytes
- Clade: Angiosperms
- Clade: Eudicots
- Clade: Rosids
- Order: Fabales
- Family: Fabaceae
- Subfamily: Caesalpinioideae
- Clade: Mimosoid clade
- Genus: Acacia
- Species: A. arafurica

Binomial name
- Acacia arafurica Tindale & Kodela
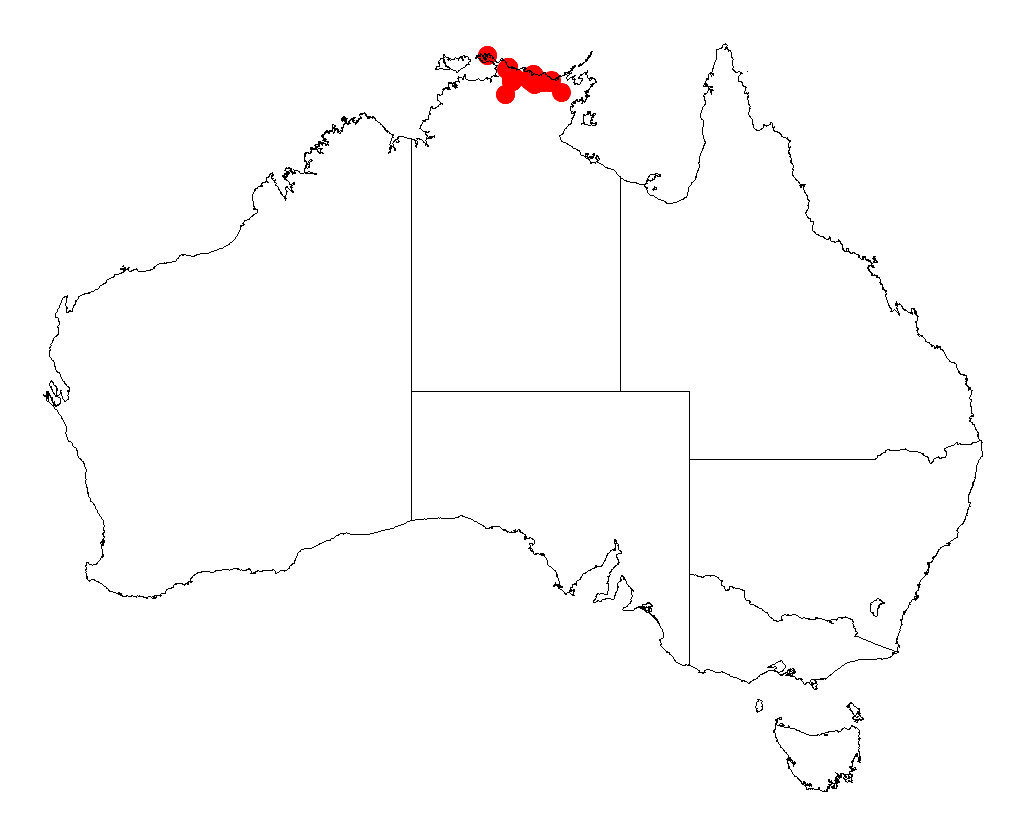
- Occurrence data from AVH

Synonyms
- Racosperma arafuricum (Tindale & Kodela) Pedley

Species of plant

Acacia arafurica is a species of flowering plant in the family Fabaceae and is endemic to the far north of the Northern Territory. It is a shrub or tree obliquely egg-shaped to diamond-shaped phyllodes, flowers arranged in spikes of golden yellow flowers, and papery, linear pods up to 105 mm (4.1 in) long.

== Description ==
Acacia arafurica is a shrub or tree that typically grows up to 4 m high, with densely hairy, terete branchlets. The phyllodes are asymmetrically egg-shaped to diamond-shaped, 15–34 mm (0.59–1.34 in) long and 9–25 mm (0.35–0.98 in) wide. The phyllodes are leathery, with three to five prominent veins and a prominent gland 1.6–5 mm (0.063–0.197 in) long above the base. The flowers are golden-yellow and usually borne singly or rarely in pairs in axils, 10–21 mm (0.39–0.83 in) long and 4.0–5.5 mm (0.16–0.22 in) wide, each flower on a peduncle 2–5 mm (0.079–0.197 in) long. Flowering occurs between April and July and the fruit is a linear, more or less straight, hairy, papery Pod 65–105 mm (2.6–4.1 in) long that resembles a string of beads. The seeds are 6.0–7.0 mm (0.24–0.28 in) long and 2.1–3.1 mm (0.083–0.122 in) wide and glossy black.

Acacia arafurica is distinguished from A. sublanata by its thicker and larger phyllodes, its longer peduncles, and its inflorescences arranged in the form of a spike (spicate).

== Taxonomy ==
Acacia arafurica was first formally described in 1992 by the botanists Mary Tindale and Phillip Kodela in the journal Telpoea. The specific epithet (arafurica) refers to the Arafura Sea which lies to the north of where A. arafurica is found.

== Distribution and habitat ==
This species of wattle is found from the Cobourg Peninsula to Maningrida and Nabarlek in the north of the Northern Territory, where it grows in sand in swampy areas on coastal river flats or near streams in the gorge country, sometimes in open forest.

== See also ==
- List of Acacia species
