= Acacia lacertensis =

Scientific classification
- Kingdom: Plantae
- Clade: Embryophytes
- Clade: Tracheophytes
- Clade: Spermatophytes
- Clade: Angiosperms
- Clade: Eudicots
- Clade: Rosids
- Order: Fabales
- Family: Fabaceae
- Subfamily: Caesalpinioideae
- Clade: Mimosoid clade
- Genus: Acacia
- Species: A. lacertensis

Binomial name
- Acacia lacertensis Pedley
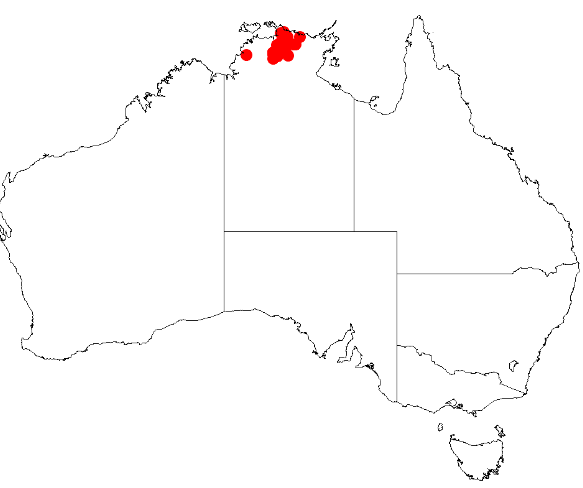
- Occurrence data from AVH

Synonyms
- Racosperma lacertense (Pedley) Pedley

Species of legume

Acacia lacertensis is a species of flowering plant in the family Fabaceae and is endemic to the north of the Northern Territory, Australia. It is a slender shrub or tree, with straight or shallowly s-shaped, sometimes slightly down-curved phyllodes, narrowed at both ends, spikes of golden yellow flowers and linear, more or less straight, glabrous pods.

== Description ==
Acacia lacertensis is a slender shrub or tree that typically grows to a height of up to 8 m (26 ft) with a sparse canopy and branchlets that are angular at the extremities and sometimes have stout, glabrous branchlets, often lightly covered with a powdery bloom. The phyllodes are straight or slightly s-shaped, narrowed at both ends, sometimes slightly down-curved, 100–170 mm (3.9–6.7 in) long and 10–25 mm (0.39–0.98 in) wide or up to 40 mm (1.6 in) wide on juvenile plants. The phyllodes have many longitudinal veins with two or three more prominent than the rest, and a gland 1–5 mm (0.039–0.197 in) above the pulvinus. The pulvinus is 3–7 mm (0.12–0.28 in) long. The flowers are golden yellow and borne in a raceme up to 1.5 mm (0.059 in) long of loosely flowered spikes 4–6.5 mm (0.16–0.26 in) long on glabrous peduncles 5–10 mm (0.20–0.39 in) long. Flowering occurs in June and July, and the pods are linear, more or less straight and glabrous, 80–90 mm (3.1–3.5 in) long, 3–4 mm (0.12–0.16 in) wide and convex over the seeds. The seeds are oblong, 3.8–4.5 mm (0.15–0.18 in) long, 1.7–2.3 mm (0.067–0.091 in) wide with a cup-shaped aril on the end.

== Taxonomy ==
Acacia lacertensis was first formally described by Leslie Pedley in the journal Austrobaileya from specimens collected near Narbalek in the Northern Territory. The specific epithet (lacertensis) means 'from the lizard', an indirect reference to the Alligator River where this species occurs.

== Distribution and habitat ==
This species of wattle grows on the sandy banks of watercourses on the East Alligator River and its tributaries on the western and northern margins of the west Arnhemland sandstone plateau.

== See also ==
- List of Acacia species
