= Ptilotus comatus =

Scientific classification
- Kingdom: Plantae
- Clade: Tracheophytes
- Clade: Angiosperms
- Clade: Eudicots
- Order: Caryophyllales
- Family: Amaranthaceae
- Genus: Ptilotus
- Species: P. comatus

Binomial name
- Ptilotus comatus Benl

Species of grass-like plant

Ptilotus comatus is a species of flowering plant in the family Amaranthaceae and is endemic to the north of the Northern Territory. It is an ephemeral herb, with more or less sessile, narrowly linear to narrowly elliptic and hairy leaves, and cylindrical spikes of sometimes more than 80 reddish-purple flowers.

== Description ==
Ptilotus comatus is an ephemeral herb up to 60 cm (24 in) tall with upright, hairy, greyish-green stems. Its leaves are arranged alternately, more or less sessile, narrowly linear to narrowly elliptic 5–15 mm (0.20–0.59 in) long and 0.6–1.5 mm (0.024–0.059 in) wide. The flowers are densely arranged in up to 30 oval or cylindrical spikes, the large spikes 10–40 mm (0.39–1.57 in) long and 5–8 mm (0.20–0.31 in) wide with sometimes more than 80 reddish-purple flowers. The bracts are narrowly oblong to egg-shaped, about 3 mm (0.12 in) long and the bracteoles are 1.6–2 mm (0.063–0.079 in) long. The outer tepals are 3.2–3.6 mm (0.13–0.14 in) long, the inner tepals 3.3–3.5 mm (0.13–0.14 in) long. There are five stamens and the style is 0.5–0.8 mm (0.020–0.031 in) long, the ovary 1.2 mm (0.047 in) long.

== Taxonomy ==
Ptilotus comatus was first formally described in 1984 by Gerhard Benl in the journal Muelleria from specimens collected 1 km (0.62 mi) north of the Nabarlek airstrip in 1979.

== Distribution and habitat ==
Ptilotus comatus has been recorded as growing in forest on sand, "sandy depressions in broken sandstone" and in a "dry open sandy area" in a restricted area east of Oenpelli in Arnhem Land.

== Conservation status ==
This species of Ptilotus is listed as "data deficient" under the Northern Territory Government Territory Parks and Wildlife Conservation Act.

== See also ==
- List of Ptilotus species
