= Gwendolyne Stevens =

Gwendolyne Daphne Stevens
- Born: Gwendolyne Daphne Healey; 7 June 1908; Quorn, South Australia
- Died: 3 March 1974 (aged 65); Kensington Park, South Australia
- Occupations: nurse, entrepreneur
- Employer(s): Adelaide Hospital; Parkside Mental Hospital
- Known for: discovering a major uranium deposit
- Spouse: George Dempster Stevens
- Children: two

Gwendolyne Daphne Stevens born Gwendolyne Daphne Healey (7 June 1908 – 3 March 1974) was an Australian hospital proprietor, sheep breeder and mining entrepreneur. She established several successful businesses culminating in the discovery that led to the creation of the Nabarlek Uranium Mine in the Northern Territory.

== Life ==
Stevens was born in the town of Quorn in Australia in 1908. Her parents were also both born in South Australia. Her mother was Jessie Gwendolyne (born Napier) and her father was Hugo Albert Valentine Healey. She was educated at St Peter's Girls' School and she first trained as a nurse at the Adelaide Hospital qualifying in 1929 and as a psychiatric nurse at Parkside Mental Hospital in 1931 and she soon becoming sister-in-charge.

In 1934 she opened a private psychiatric hospital in Darrach House. The large house had been built for James Waddell Marshall who ran the department store. She ran this hospital for eighteen years. In 1940 she married George Dempster Stevens and they had two children. She sold her hospital in 1952 and bought a farm.

Her farm was a stud for sheep and it was called Sterling Downs. She took an interest each week, but a manager saw to its day to day running. She moved the stud to Sterling Park and that is where she discovered that the land was a source of sand. She made money selling the sand to the local council.

With her new interest in mining she investigated the potential around Oenpelli (now Gunbalanya) in the Northern Territory. She had the rights to over 1250 sq. miles and she named the area "nabarlek" after the local nocturnal little rock-wallaby. She partnered with Queensland Mines Ltd in the venture. Uranium was discovered in 1970 and in 1973 she sold out in return for a royalty from the Nabarlek Uranium Mine. She had intended to share the wealth with the aboriginal people who had lived on the land, but she died in 1974 in the Adelaide suburb of Kensington Park from a brain haemorrhage.
