= Boronia xanthastrum =

Conservation status
- Near Threatened (TPWCA)

Scientific classification
- Kingdom: Plantae
- Clade: Tracheophytes
- Clade: Angiosperms
- Clade: Eudicots
- Clade: Rosids
- Order: Sapindales
- Family: Rutaceae
- Genus: Boronia
- Species: B. xanthastrum

Binomial name
- Boronia xanthastrum Duretto
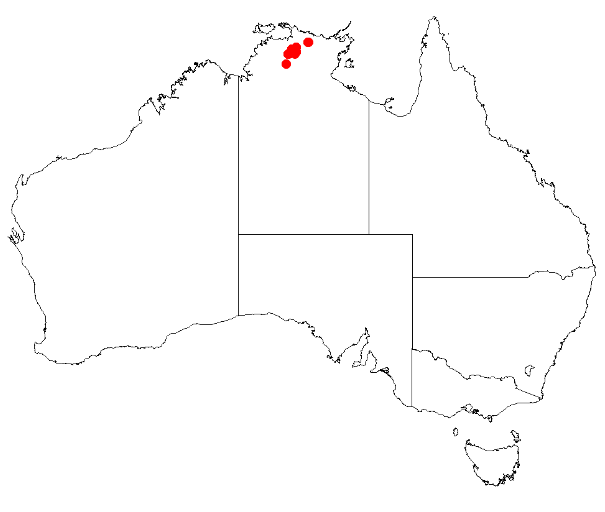
- Occurrence data from Australasian Virtual Herbarium

Species of flowering plant

Boronia xanthastrum is a species of small shrub that is endemic to the Northern Territory. It has yellow, star-like hairs on the young branches, leaves and parts of the flowers, elliptical to lance-shaped leaves and small yellowish green flowers.

== Description ==
Boronia xanthastrum is an annual or sometimes a short-lived perennial shrub that typically grows to a height of about 40 cm (16 in). Its branches, leaves and parts of the flowers are covered with star-like yellow hairs that turn white as they age. The leaves are narrow elliptical to lance-shaped, 10–36 mm (0.39–1.42 in) long and 2.5–6.5 mm (0.098–0.256 in) wide on a petiole 0.5–1.5 mm (0.020–0.059 in) long. The flowers are borne singly or in groups of up to three in leaf axils on a peduncle 0.5–1 mm (0.020–0.039 in) long. The flowers are surrounded by leaf-like prophylls 1.5–4 mm (0.059–0.157 in) long and 0.5 mm (0.020 in) wide and the sepals are egg-shaped to triangular, 3.5–6 mm (0.14–0.24 in) long, 1–2.5 mm (0.039–0.098 in) wide and hairy on the outer surface. The petals are yellowish green, 2.5–4 mm (0.098–0.157 in) long and 1–1.5 mm (0.039–0.059 in) wide and hairy on the upper surface. The sepals, but not the petals enlarge as the fruit develops. Flowering occurs between January and June and the fruit is a glabrous capsule 4–6 mm (0.16–0.24 in) long and about 2 mm (0.079 in) wide.

== Taxonomy and naming ==
Boronia xanthastrum was first formally described in 1997 by Marco F. Duretto who published the description in the journal Australian Systematic Botany from specimens collected by Lyndley Craven near Twin Falls in 1980. The specific epithet (xanthastrum) is derived from ancient Greek words meaning "yellow" and "star", referring to the colour and shape of the hairs that give this species a yellow appearance.

== Distribution and habitat ==
This boronia grows on schists and sandstone in heath and woodland and is mainly found in Kakadu National Park but also occurs in Nitmiluk National Park and disjunctly in north-east Arnhem Land.

== Conservation status ==
This species is classified as "near threatened" under the Territory Parks and Wildlife Conservation Act 2000. It was previously listed as "vulnerable" under the Australian Government Environment Protection and Biodiversity Conservation Act 1999.
