= Robert Story (botanist) =

Australian botanist (1913–1999)

Robert (Bob) Story OAM (19 August 1913 Fort Beaufort – 20 February 1999 Australia) was a South African botanist and ecologist. His father, who died in 1925, was a farm manager who had studied at Edinburgh University and obtained a Diploma in Agriculture.

After spending 1926-30 at Grey High School in Port Elizabeth, Robert Story attended Rhodes University from 1931-33 where he obtained a B.Sc., after which he enrolled at Witwatersrand University from 1934-35 where he graduated with an M.Sc. and was later awarded a D.Sc. His first appointment was to the Leeuwkuil Pasture Research Station near Vereeniging in 1936. During World War II he saw service in Madagascar, North Africa and Italy. At the close of the War in 1945 he was transferred to the Botanical Survey Section of the Division of Botany and stationed at Grahamstown. Here he carried out a botanical survey of the Keiskammahoek District and it was published as 'Botanical Survey of South Africa Memoir No. 27' in 1952. In the same year he relocated to Pretoria as Officer in Charge of the Botanical Survey Section.

He accompanied the Harvard-Smithsonian-Peabody expedition to Botswana and South-West Africa in 1955, revisiting the region in 1956 and 1958 and travelling through the Kaokoveld to the Kunene River. As a result of these trips he published 'Some Plants Used by the Bushmen in Obtaining Food and Water' in 1958 as 'Botanical Survey of South Africa Memoir No. 30'.

Robert Story with his wife Sybil and daughters emigrated to Australia in July 1959 where he took up a position in Canberra with the Land Use Research Division of CSIRO as ecologist and botanist. He was appalled at the environmental damage that was being done in the Hunter Valley, where eucalypts were felled and left to rot. During 1969-70 he was posted to Patagonia on an environmental training mission, a trip which in his opinion was a waste of time. He was convinced that rampant population growth lay at the root of most environmental problems. He, Nancy Burbidge, Alec Baillie Costin and a few other botanists were instrumental in the 1960 founding of the National Parks Association of the Australian Capital Territory, and was one of the first Presidents of the NPA in the 1960s, as well as being a founding member of the Kosciuszko Huts Association and its President during the years 1973-76. He was awarded the Medal of the Order of Australia in 1989 for "service to conservation and national parks".

His specimens number some 5000, and were collected in South Africa, Namibia and Botswana. He is commemorated in Acacia storyi Tindale and Paenula storyi Orchard.
