= Bill Neidjie =

Last surviving speaker of the Gaagudju language (1913–2002)

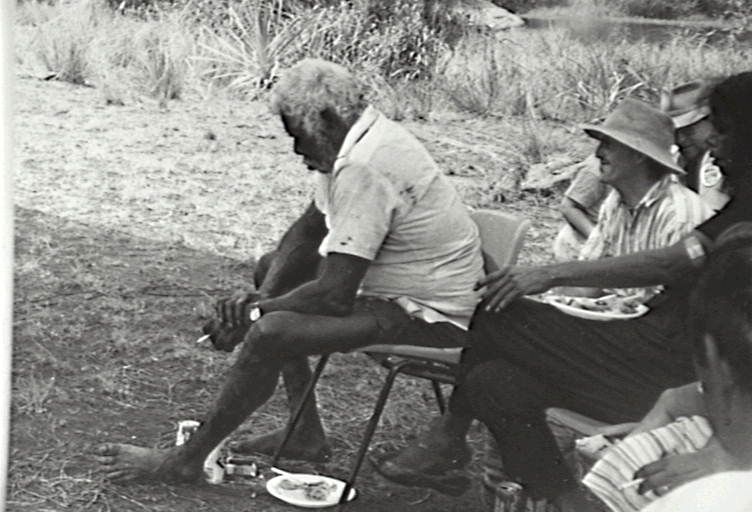
Bill Neidjie in 1989

Bill Neidjie OAM (c. 1913 – 23 May 2002), nicknamed "Kakadu Man", was the last surviving speaker of the Gaagudju language, an Aboriginal Australian language from northern Kakadu, after which Kakadu National Park is named. He was an elder of the Gaagudju people and a custodian of the land, who cared deeply about preserving his culture and land.

== Early life and education ==
Neijdie was born around 1913 at Alawanydajawany, on the East Alligator River in the Kakadu region of the Northern Territory, into the Bunitj clan of the Gaagudju people. His father was Nadampala and his mother was Lucy Wirlmaka, from the Ulbuk clan of the Amurdak people.

He had little formal education, spending only a couple of years at school at Oenpelli (present-day Gunbalanya), but learnt about his traditional culture, people and lands from his father and grandfather.

== Working life ==
From about the age of 20 he worked first with buffalo hunters, then at a timber mill, and then on board a lugger transporting people and goods along the North Coast of the Northern Territory and to remote island communities.

He was initiated at a ceremony at Ubirr in the early 1940s.

During the Second World War ("the big fight") he helped in the defence of Australia, working at the radar station at Cape Don and working on supply boats between Darwin and other ports. He was in Darwin during the Japanese bombings in 1942 and helped Aboriginal people during and after the devastation.

He acquired the nickname "Big Bill" because of his physique and strength, and was also called "Kakadu Man", after the title of his first book.

=== Kakadu ===
He was a senior elder of Kakadu National Park and a traditional owner of the Bunitj estate in northern Kakadu, perhaps the most spectacular national park in Australia. His decision to open up this land to other people was instrumental in the creation of Kakadu National Park. Neidje was instrumental in the decision to lease his traditional lands to the Commonwealth of Australia so that it could be managed as a wild area and as a resource to be shared by all Australians.

After helping establish Kakadu as a National Park in 1979, he returned there to commit the rest of his life to supporting the joint management of the Park. He worked as a ranger and cultural adviser for the park, and his work was critical in gaining World Heritage status for the park. Kakadu was listed in three stages: stage 1 in 1981, stage 2 in 1987, and the entire park in 1992.

== Recognition ==
In the 1989 Queen's Birthday Honours Neidjie he was awarded the Medal of the Order of Australia for his services to conservation.

He became known internationally as "Kakadu man", for both his work in the park and books of poetry and prose, with his first book being titled Kakadu Man.

In 1988, Kakadu was featured in the February issue of National Geographic Magazine, and was the focus of the National Geographic television documentary entitled Twilight Of The Dreamtime, in which Big Bill figured prominently. His son, Jonathan Yarramarrna, appeared with him, and parts of the film dealt with the future of Kakadu and specifically with Big Bill's preparation for Jonathan to assume the custodianship of his family's tribal lands.

== Later life, death and legacy ==
In many Indigenous Australian cultures, there are traditional secrets passed down from generation to generation, and it is taboo to reveal these secrets to a non-initiate. As he grew older, Neidjie realised that he might be in the position, as one of the last Gaagudju initiates, of taking these secrets to the grave with him, and so made the courageous decision to break this taboo, so that his culture might live on. In addition to entrusting some of the custodianship of tribal lands to his son Jonathan, he related many of his stories to the anthropologist Stephen Davis and others, and published two books, in which he related his passion for the land of which he was part, and insisted on the importance of managing the land in the traditional ways. He hoped that, one day, his culture might thrive once again, and his grandchildren, or their grandchildren, might pick up the threads once more.

Neidjie died on 23 May 2002. The Federal Minister for the Environment and Heritage, David Kemp, said, "He was instrumental in the establishment of Kakadu National Park and was deeply committed to sharing his love for his country, his respect for the heritage of his country and his Indigenous culture with countless thousands of park visitors and all who shared his love for the natural world".

== Selected works ==
GAMU The Dreamtime Stories, Life and Feelings of Big Bill Neidjie as told to Sarah George. Publisher Cyclops Press 2022. Sydney NSW. ISBN 978-0-6489527-5-6 www.cyclopsproductions.com.au

GAMU is the most comprehensive book of Big Bill Neidjie's stories and biography ever published.

Books authored by Bill Neidjie:

1. Neidjie, Bill (1989). Taylor, Keith (ed.). Story about Feeling. Broome, W.A: Magabala Books. ISBN 978-0-958-81010-4.
2. Neidjie, Bill (1991). Speaking for the Earth: Nature's Law and the Aboriginal Way. introduction by Michael W. Fox. Washington, DC: Center for Respect of Life and Environment.
3. Neidjie, Bill; Lang, Mark (2015). Old Man's Story: The Last Thoughts of Kakadu Elder Bill Neidjie. photographer Mark Lang. Australian Capital Territory 2601: Aboriginal Studies Press.
