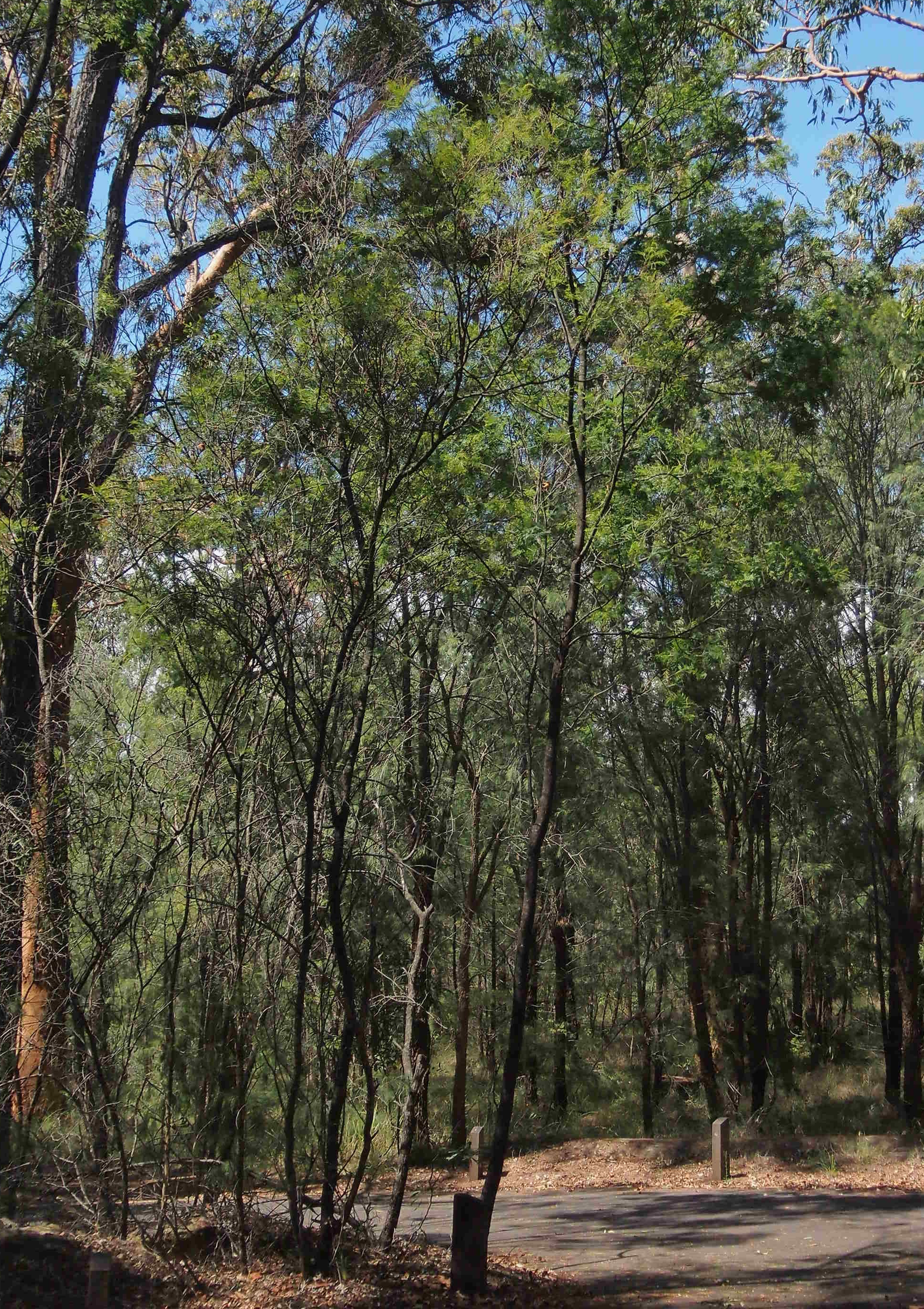

Conservation status
- Near Threatened (NCA)

Scientific classification
- Kingdom: Plantae
- Clade: Embryophytes
- Clade: Tracheophytes
- Clade: Spermatophytes
- Clade: Angiosperms
- Clade: Eudicots
- Clade: Rosids
- Order: Fabales
- Family: Fabaceae
- Subfamily: Caesalpinioideae
- Clade: Mimosoid clade
- Genus: Acacia
- Species: A. storyi

Binomial name
- Acacia storyi Tindale
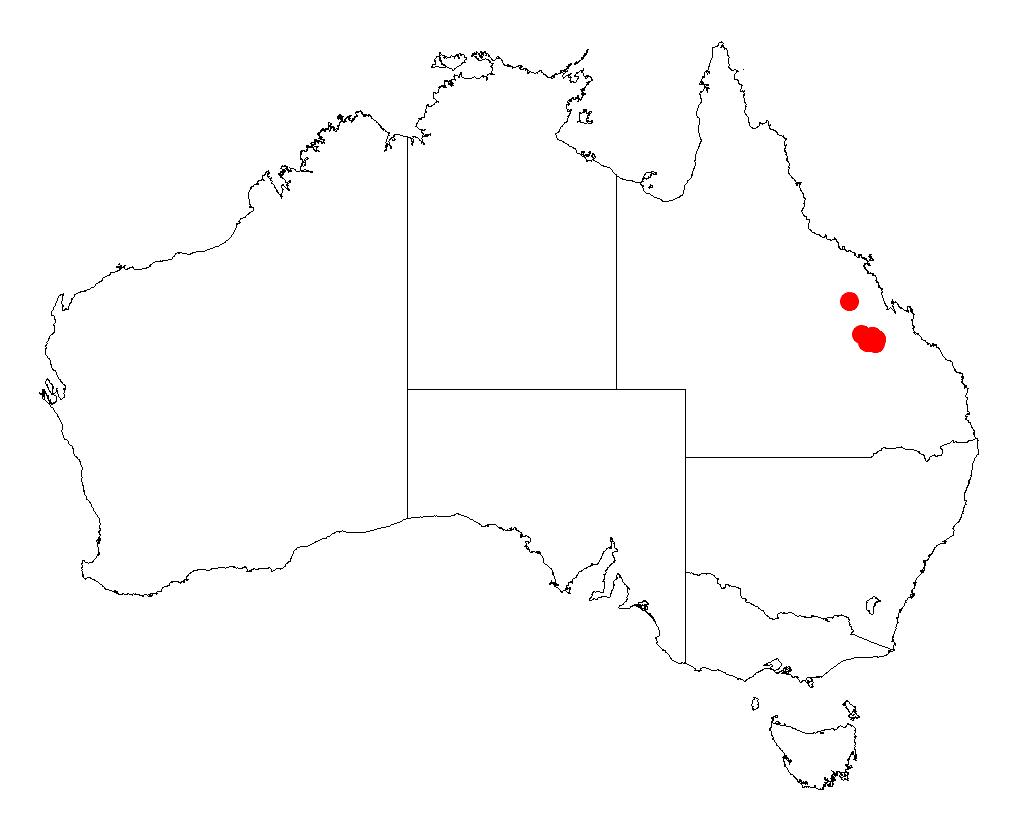
- Occurrence data from AVH

= Acacia storyi =

Story's wattle

Species of legume

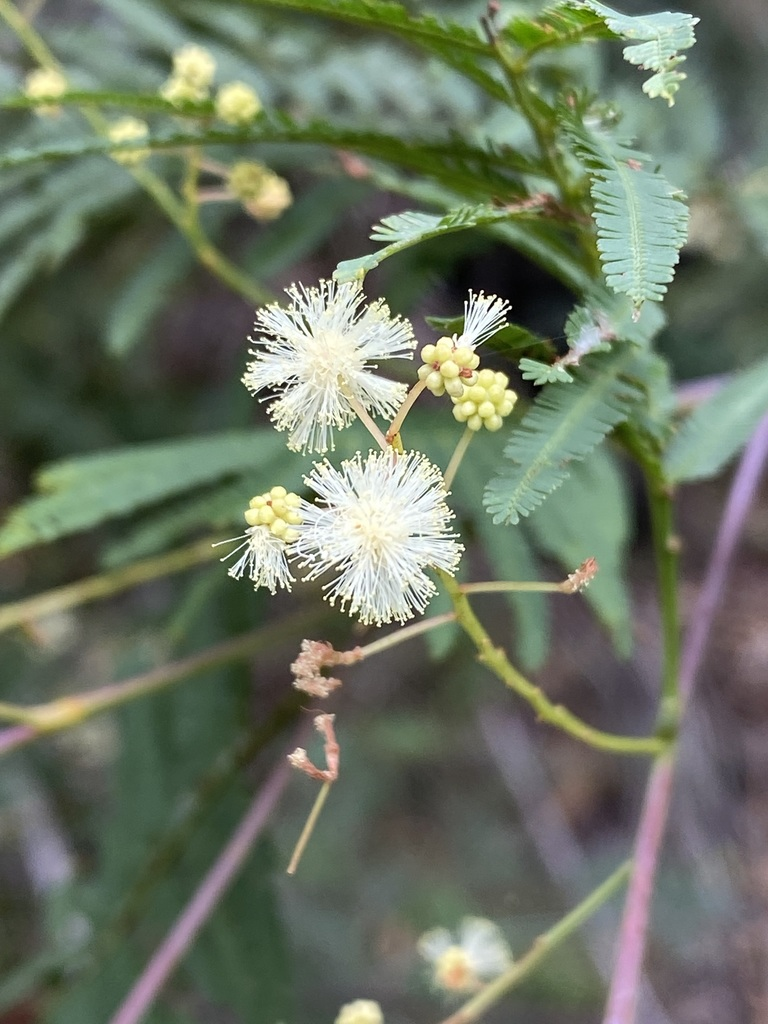
In the Blackdown Tableland National Park

Acacia storyi, commonly known as Story's wattle, is a species of Acacia of the subgenus Botrycephalae that is native to eastern Australia. It is listed as near threatened according to the Nature Conservation Act 1992 of Queensland.

== Description ==
The shrub or tree typically grows to 6 metres (20 ft) in height. It has smooth grey-green bark, purplish-red branchlets and dark green subcoriaceous leaves along a 4 to 11 cm (1.6 to 4.3 in) long rachis containing 8 to 18 pairs of pinnae that are 2 to 6 cm (0.79 to 2.36 in) in length. Each pinnae is composed of 26 to 92 pairs of pinnules that have an oblong to cultrate shape with a length of 1.5 to 4 mm (0.059 to 0.157 in) and a width of 0.4 to 0.6 mm (0.016 to 0.024 in). It blooms between April and August producing yellow flowers. The simple inflorescences are found in axillary racemes or in terminal false-panicles. The spherical flower-heads contain 14 to 20 cream to pale yellow coloured flowers. It forms seed pods between August and December. The coriaceous, dark red-brown or blue-black coloured pods are mostly straight-sided but can be slightly to deeply constricted between each of the seeds. The glabrous pods have a length of 2.5 to 11 cm (0.98 to 4.33 in) and a width of 8 to 12 mm (0.31 to 0.47 in) and are covered in a powdery white coating. The seeds found within the pods are around 6 mm (0.24 in) in length and 3.5 mm (0.14 in) wide. It is closely related to both Acacia filicifolia and Acacia olsenii.

== Taxonomy ==
The species was first formally identified by the botanist Mary Tindale in 1966 as part of the work New taxa of Acacia from Eastern Australia as published in the Proceedings of the Linnean Society of New South Wales. It was reclassified as Racosperma storyi by Leslie Pedley in 1987 then transferred back to genus Acacia in 2001. The type specimen was collected in 1961 by M.Lazarides and R.Story from around Rockland Spring to the south east of Blackwater. The specific epithet honour the collector of the type specimen.

== Distribution ==
It is endemic to the Central Highlands Region of Queensland where it has a limited distribution along the Blackdown Tableland and lower plains along the western side of the tableland area. It is mostly situated on sandstone plateaux as a part of open forest communities often along with Acacia gittinsii and Acacia hendersonii. The bulk of the population is found within the National Park with three smaller populations found near Rockland Spring, along upper Davy Creek and to the north east of Woorabinda. Other associated species are Eucalyptus tereticornis, Eucalyptus cloeziana and various species of Aristida.

== See also ==
- List of Acacia species
