= Wildman River =

Wildman
- Location of the Wildman River mouth in the Northern Territory
- Etymology: E. T. Wildman

Location
- Country: Australia
- Territory: Northern Territory
- Region: Darwin Coastal (IBRA)

Physical characteristics
- Source confluence: East and West Branches of the Wildman River
  - location: southwest of Kapalga
  - elevation: 20 m (66 ft)
- Mouth: Finke Bay, Van Diemen Gulf, Timor Sea
  - location: Kakadu
  - coordinates: 12°18′S 132°03′E
  - elevation: 0 m (0 ft)
- Length: 98 km (61 mi)
- Basin size: 4,818 km^{2} (1,860 sq mi)
- Discharge
  - average: 25.4 m^{3}/s (900 cu ft/s)

Basin features
- Tributaries
  - left: Alligator Creek (Northern Territory)
- National park: Kakadu National Park

The Wildman River is a river in the Darwin Coastal bioregion of the Northern Territory, Australia.

== Location and features ==
Formed by the confluence of the East and West Branches of the Wildman River, the river rises southwest of Kapalga in the Kakadu National Park, west of the Alligator Rivers watershed. The Wildman River flows generally northeast and then east, joined by its only major tributary, the Alligator Creek. Approximately 150 kilometres (93 mi) east of Darwin, the river follows a highly meandering course as it reaches the western fringe of the Manassie Floodplain and heads northwest. At this point, the river's eastern bank define a 10-kilometre (6.2 mi) stretch of the western boundary of the Kakadu National Park. The Wildman River reaches its mouth, emptying into Finke Bay in the Van Diemen Gulf of the Timor Sea. The river descends 20 metres (66 ft) over its 98-kilometre (61 mi) course.

The river catchment occupies an area of 4,818 square kilometres (1,860 sq mi) and is wedged between the Mary River catchment to the west and the Alligator Rivers catchment to the east. It has a mean annual outflow of 800 gigalitres (1.046×10^{9} cu yd),

The estuary formed at the river mouth is in near pristine condition. It occupies an area of 4.37 square kilometres (2 sq mi) and is river dominated in nature with a tide dominated delta and is composed of a single channel with an area of 121.9 hectares (301 acres) covered with mangroves.

== Etymology ==
The river was named by John Davis, the Government store keeper in 1866, after E. T. Wildman, the Secretary to the South Australian Crown Lands Commission, who was a friend of Davis.

== See also ==
- List of rivers of Australia § Northern Territory
