= Patrick Cahill (Australian hunter) =

Buffalo hunter and protector of Aborigines (c.1863–1923)

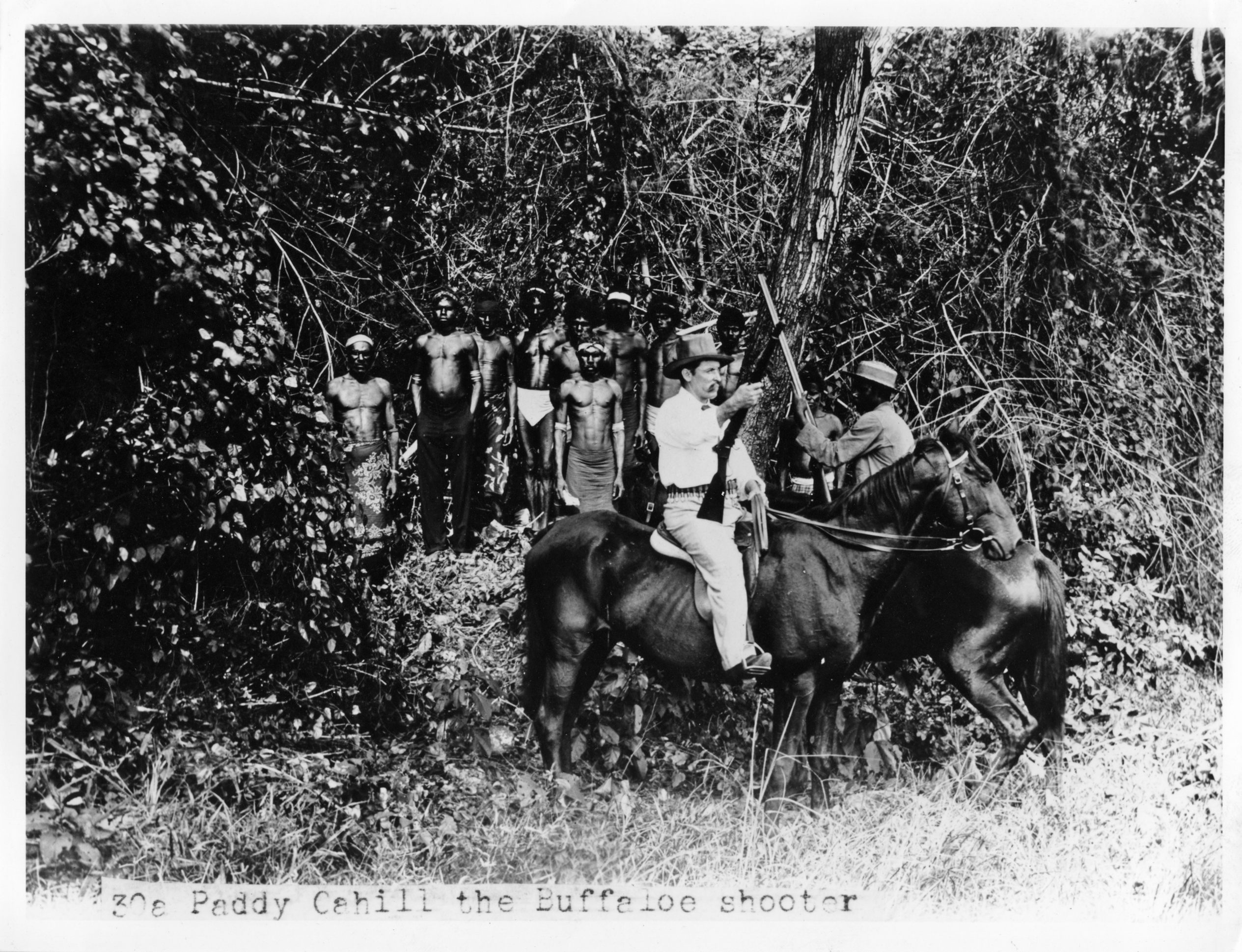
Paddy Cahill in 1901

Patrick "Paddy" Cahill (c. 1863 – 4 February 1923) was a buffalo hunter, farmer, and protector of Aborigines in the Northern Territory of Australia.

== Biography ==
Cahill was born in around 1863 in Laidley, Queensland and was the son of Thomas and Sarah Cahill. His father was a blacksmith and his birth was not registered.

Cahill moved to the Northern Territory in 1883 when he and his brothers (Tom and Matt) joined Nathaniel Buchanan overlanding (droving) 20,000 cattle from western Queensland to Wave Hill Station; he and his brothers then stayed on to manage the station and later Delamere Station and Gordon Downs Station as well. During this time Cahill was involved in the Wave Hill Massacre/s that took place in the early 1920s and an informant stated that he had been called over in about 1924 to deal with cattle killers. He was recorded as having shot over thirty people.

Soon after Cahill became aware of 60,000 water buffalo in the Alligator River floodplains, near Darwin, and entered into a partnership with William Johnson to shoot them for their hides and horns. They employed groups of Aboriginal people to assist them and hunted primarily in the Dry Season in semi-mobile camps throughout the region. During this period he is credited as being one of the first to shoot buffalo from horseback and much of his success has been attributed to his horse St Lawrence who was considered particularly fast and intelligent.

From December 1898 to March 1899 Cahill wrote a series of seven newspaper articles, entitled "In the Northern Territory buffalo country" for the Northern Territory Times and Gazette. While visiting Darwin in 1898 he also met with Banjo Paterson and spoke to him of the main topics of interest in the town and Paterson later wrote about him, and their meeting, in The Bulletin. This article stated of Cahill:

He is popularly reported to pursue the infuriated buffalo at full gallop, standing on his saddle, and dressed in a towel and a diamond ring, and yelling like a wild Indian

— Banjo Paterson, The Bulletin, 31 December 1898

Early in 1899, when there was a downturn in profits buffalo hunting, Cahill purchased a pearling lugger Ethel. Later that year, on 18 October, he married Maria Pickford at St Mary's Star of the Sea Cathedral in Darwin. Within three weeks of their wedding Cahill travelled more than 300 km to assist his partner, Johnston, who had been gored by a buffalo.

In 1906 Cahill and Johnston settled in Oenpelli (Gunbalanya) where, with the help of Gaagudju people, they established a farm where they grew fruit, vegetables, sisal, cotton and other products. Cahill was known to have a deep interest and empathy with the Gaagudju people and he soon learned to speak many of the Aboriginal languages of the region and was always careful to use tribal names.

In 1912 Cahill was appointed Protector of Aborigines for the Alligator River and in June 1912 was visited by Walter Baldwin Spencer. Spencer was very impressed with him and was surprised that he had gained entry to sacred and secret rituals and, following this visit, Cahill became Spencer's ‘major anthropological correspondent’, and a major informant for Spencer's Native Tribes of the Northern Territory of Australia (1914). Cahill also supplied the National Museum of Victoria with zoological specimens and a collection of over 100 bark paintings which he added to those already donated by Spencer. This collection became known as the Spencer-Cahill collection and it was instrumental in establishing a perception of Aboriginal art in Australia.

Also based on this visit Spencer recommended a 6,000 square km reserve, the Alligator River Reserve, be formed around Cahill's lease, with Cahill and Maria appointed to run the reserve. Cahill planned to employ Aboriginal people to work under 'European' supervision and establish a wide range of experimental crops (including tobacco) and run a cattle and dairy herd. In 1915 their first shipment of butter was boycotted by Darwin unionists because it was produced by 'black labour' with concerns being raised about the ethics of its production. In 1917 there was a poisoning attempt on Cahill by Aboriginal workers; three men were arrested and taken to Darwin, two of these men were sentenced to six months imprisonment by the magistrate and the other, the supposed ringleader, had to await the next sitting of the Northern Territory Supreme Court.

This venture was, ultimately, a failure due to financial mismanagement and staffing difficulties, however, it was finally ended by the Spanish flu outbreak there in 1919 in which Cahill and Maria both almost died. Cahill also had major political difficulties at this time due to his friendship with John Anderson Gilruth, for which he was viewed as being on the 'wrong side' of the Darwin rebellion and called before the Ewing Royal Commission. In his report Hon. Norman Kirkwood Ewing found that he was "a decent man but sometimes careless"; it was also implied that he used his friendship with Gilruth to advance his son.

After the Inquiry, in 1920, Cahill's lease was officially proclaimed an Aboriginal Reserve and, in 1924, after he and his family had left the area it was transferred into the control of the Church Missionary Society and was renamed Oenpelli Mission.

In 1922 Cahill travelled to the Melbourne Cup with his wife and son. During this visit he became unwell, with a bout of influenza, and insisted on been taken to the home of his brother Tom in Sydney. He died there on 4 February 1923 and he is buried at Randwick cemetery.
