= Bill Blevin =

Australian physicist (1929–2022)

William Roderick Blevin AM DSc FAA FTSE FAIP FIP (31 October 1929 in Inverell, New South Wales – 11 August 2022) was an Australian physicist. He was elected a Fellow of the Australian Academy of Science in 1985 and appointed a Member of the Order of Australia in 1989.

Blevins died on 11 August 2022, aged 92.
