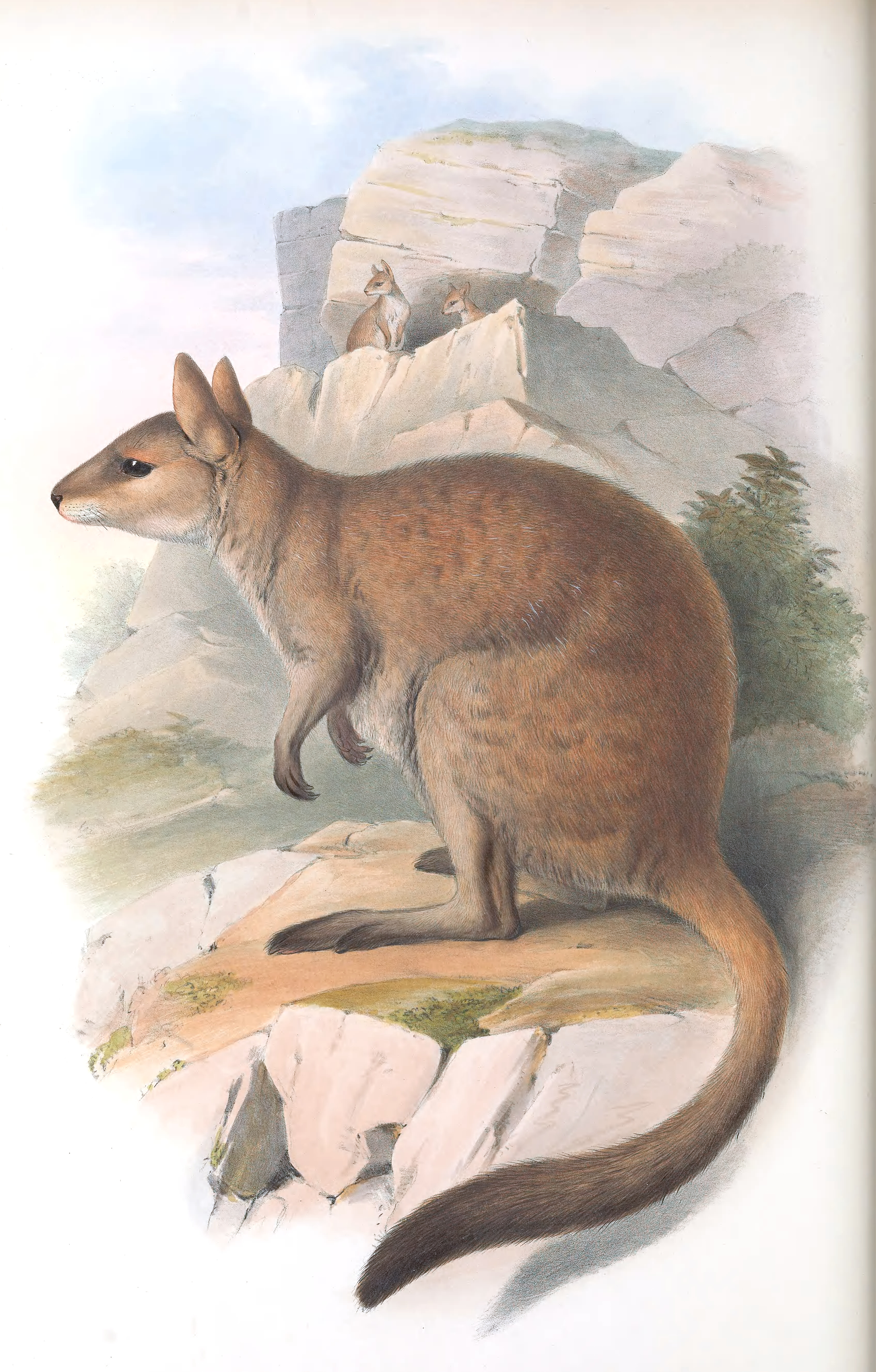
- Petrogale cocinna by John Gould and H. C. Richter, Mammals of Australia (1863)

Conservation status
- Endangered (IUCN 3.1)

Scientific classification
- Kingdom: Animalia
- Phylum: Chordata
- Class: Mammalia
- Infraclass: Marsupialia
- Order: Diprotodontia
- Family: Macropodidae
- Genus: Petrogale
- Species: P. concinna

Binomial name
- Petrogale concinna Gould, 1842
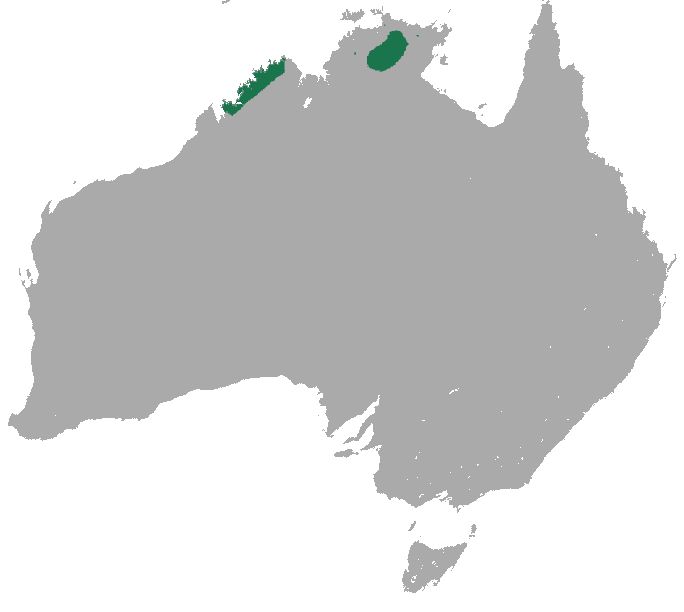
- Distribution within Australia (green)

Synonyms
- Petrogale concinna canescens (Thomas, 1909); Petrogale concinna monastria (Thomas, 1926)

= Nabarlek =

Species of marsupial

The nabarlek (Petrogale concinna) is a small species of macropod found in northern Australia. They are a shy and nocturnal animal that resides in rocky hollows and forages in the surrounding area. Their diet is grasses, sedges, and ferns found in and around their scrub covered refuges. They are distinguished by a reddish tinge to the mostly grey fur and a distinct stripe at the cheek. They move with great speed and agility when observed, with a forward leaning posture and a bushy tail that arches over the back.

== Etymology ==
The name comes from the Kunwinjku language of West Arnhem Land. The animal has also lent its name to the music rock group from the area, Nabarlek and Gwendolyne Stevens' uranium mine.

== Taxonomy ==
John Gould presented a description of this species to the Zoological Society of London in 1842, which was published in its Proceedings and introduced by the presiding chair William Yarrell as "two new species of Kangaroo". The affinities of the species have been recognised in several ways, including an arrangement that sees it placed with the 'brachyotis species group'. Other authors had separated this species to a new genus Peradorcas, producing a new combination Peradorcas concinna, although the revision by D. J. Kitchener of Petrogale did not recognise this treatment and this is maintained by other authorities. The locality of the type specimen is Wyndham, Western Australia. The specimen was collected and brought to England on the voyage of HMS Beagle.

Nabarlek is most closely related to the monjon and to the short-eared rock-wallaby Petrogale brachyotis. It was formerly considered distinct enough to be assigned its own genus, Peradorcas but it is now considered to belong, like the rest of the rock-wallabies, in the genus Petrogale.

The common name designated for a similar species, monjon for P. burbidgei, is also used to refer this species in the Kimberley region; the two species are however known to be distinct by the indigenous people from whose language the name derives. Common names for the species include the little rock-wallaby or pygmy rock-wallaby.

=== Subspecies ===
Three subspecies have been recognised:

- P. concinna concinna Gould, 1842

The nominate subspecies, found at the Top End, follows Gould's original description.

- P. concinna canescens Thomas, 1909

The Arnhem Land population. The description for this subspecies was published by Oldfield Thomas after examination of new specimens that confirmed morphological distinctions in different localities. The type specimen, already held at the British Museum, was collected in 1902 by J. T. Tunney; he had killed this animal at Nellie Creek.

- P. concinna monastria (Thomas, 1926)

A subspecies restricted to the Kimberley region.

== Description ==
A species of Petrogale, the rock wallabies, distinguished by its small size. The pelage is a grey colour, with reddish highlights at the fore-arm, legs and hind parts. The tail is also reddish grey, with a bushy end of coarser hair that begins two thirds along its length, the total length may be from 260 to 335 millimetres. The cheek is marked with a whitish stripe from the eye to the nostrils, a lighter tone that contrasts with the blackish parts of the snout. Another darker stripe is found below the eye and down the neck, the region beneath the fore-arm is also blackish. The head and body length combined in 310 to 365 mm, the smallest of the genus but for P. burbidgei. The measurement of the hindfoot is 95 to 105 mm, the ear from base to tip is 41 to 45 mm. The weight range is from 1.2 to 1.6 kilograms.

The dentition of P. cocinna is unique amongst the marsupial species, with the supernumerary molars being continually replaced. These teeth emerge in a regular size and shape, with each row containing four to six molars and another that is yet to erupt. The early loss of the premolar appears to allow this regeneration to continue throughout their life.

Nabarlek is often found with the similar P. brachyotis, whose coloration is more variable, and a young individual may be indistinguishable from this species in field observations.

== Behaviour ==
Nabarlek move quickly with a distinctive horizontal posture, the tail curled toward the middle of the back with raised hairs in the tufty end. The species has a timid disposition, although is somewhat gregarious in associations with others. Their feeding and other activities is usually nocturnal, and they may range beyond their refuge to forage.

The species will range several hundred metres from its secure position, foraging in the surrounding black soil terrain, this contrasts with the less venturous behaviour of the short-eared P. brachyotis.

The discrete and cautious nature of narbarlek makes capture of specimens difficult, they are regarded as 'trap-shy' in attempts to survey their population.

== Diet ==
The diet includes a variety of plants, including grasses, ferns and sedges. The plants consumed in Arnhem land during the wet season are the grass species of Eriachne and the sedges Cyperus cuspidatus and species of Fimbristylis, which occur in soils above the flood levels. The change in season has the species seek shelter during the day in sandstone formations and forage at local billabongs for a fern species Marsilea crenata.

The high percentage of silica in its diet, 15 to 25% in some foliage, was proposed to have favoured the continual regeneration of molars. Attempts to locate the high silica fern in later surveys have not recorded Marsilea crenata at any sites, and the complex relationship between diet and dentition remains to be examined.

== Distribution and habitat ==
The nabarlek is found in three distinct and geographically remote populations, one in Arnhem Land which includes Groote Eylandt, a larger island in the Gulf of Carpentaria, and another population between the Mary and Victoria Rivers at the Top End of the continent. The population in the northwest Kimberley region is confined to the coastal areas and on some of the islands in the Bonaparte Archipelago, these are Borda, Long, Hidden and Augustus Islands.

The habitat is usually scrubby vegetation over sandstone formations, granitic outcrops, breakaways of laterite, boulder piles and rocky slopes.

== Conservation ==
It is classified as Endangered by the IUCN.
