= Twin Falls (Northern Territory) =

Waterfall in the Northern Territory, Australia

Twin Falls Gungkurdul
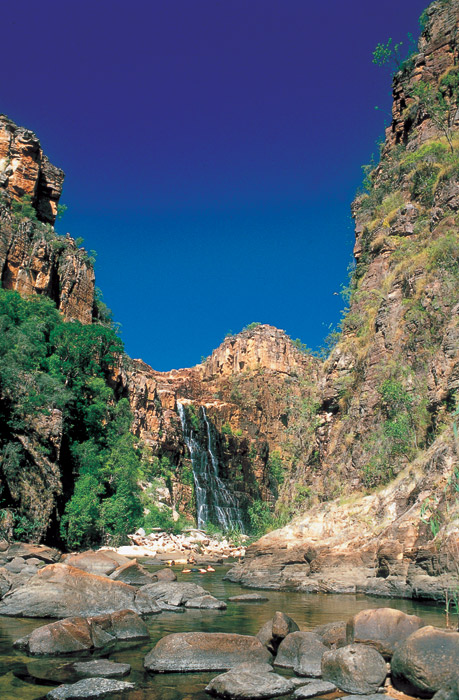

- Location within Northern Territory
- Location: Arnhem Land, Northern Territory, Australia
- Coordinates: 13°19′20″S 132°46′41″E
- Type: Cascade
- Elevation: 158 metres (518 ft) AHD
- Total height: 44–51 metres (144–167 ft)
- Number of drops: 1
- Watercourse: South Alligator River

The Twin Falls (Kundjeyhmi: Gungkurdul) is a cascade waterfall on the South Alligator River that descends over the Arnhem Land escarpment within the UNESCO World Heritage–listed Kakadu National Park in the Northern Territory of Australia. In 1980, The Twin Falls area was listed on the now-defunct Register of the National Estate.

== Location and features ==
The waterfall descends from an elevation of 158 metres (518 ft) above sea level via a series of tiers that range in height between 44–51 metres (144–167 ft). The falls are located near the eastern boundary of the national park and 80 kilometres (50 mi) south of Jabiru. The falls are accessible by four wheel drive trail, 60 kilometres (37 mi) from the Kakadu Highway and near to Jim Jim Falls.

The waterfall features within the leading one hundred images selected in 2012 by Australian Traveller magazine to promote Australia as a tourism destination.

Facilities adjacent to the waterfall include a carpark, picnic area, public toilets, and a shaded area.

== See also ==
- List of waterfalls
- List of waterfalls of the Northern Territory
- Protected areas of the Northern Territory
