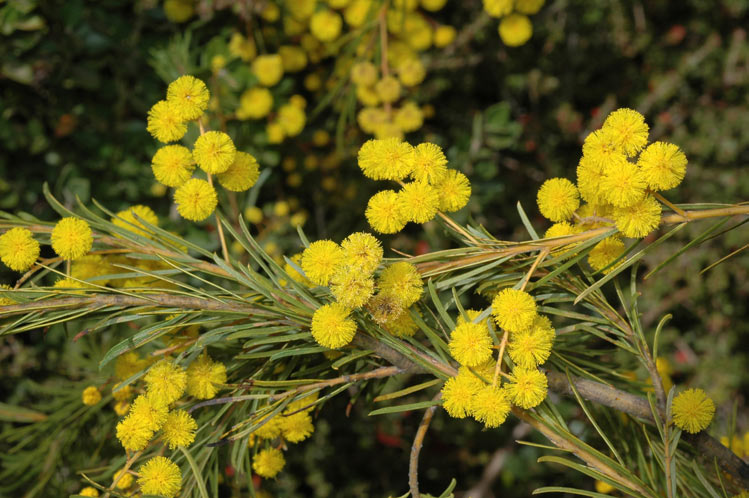
- In the Australian National Botanic Gardens

Scientific classification
- Kingdom: Plantae
- Clade: Tracheophytes
- Clade: Angiosperms
- Clade: Eudicots
- Clade: Rosids
- Order: Fabales
- Family: Fabaceae
- Subfamily: Caesalpinioideae
- Clade: Mimosoid clade
- Genus: Acacia
- Species: A. gittinsii

Binomial name
- Acacia gittinsii Pedley
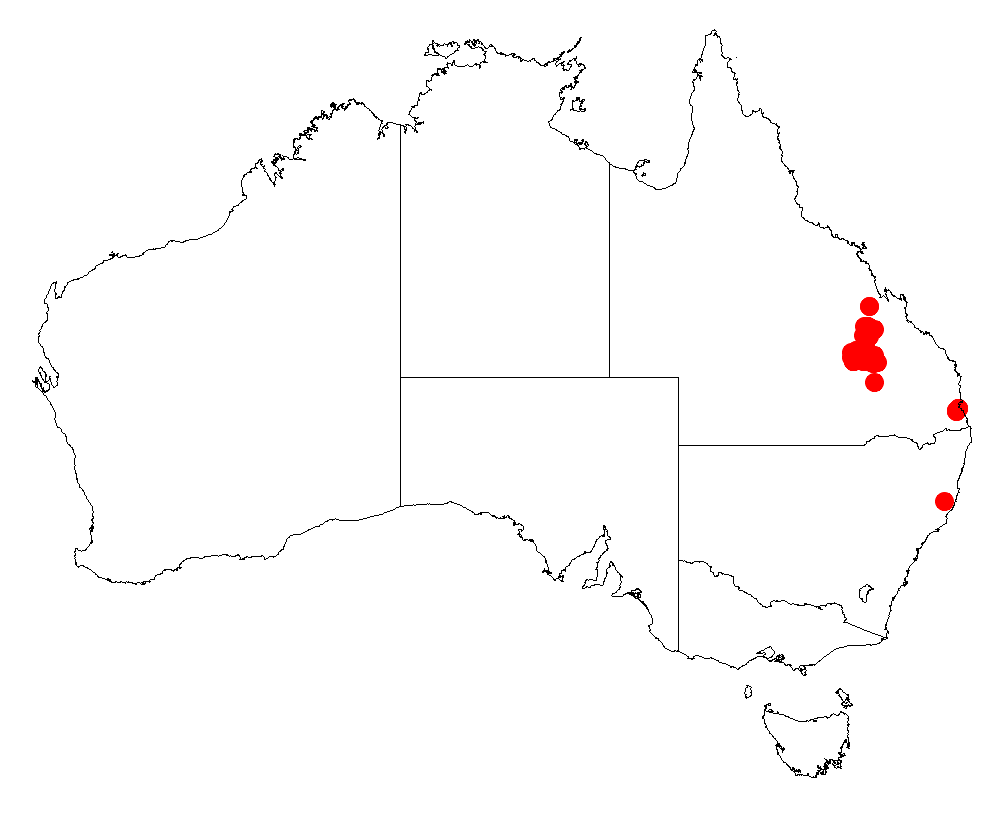
- Occurrence data from AVH

Synonyms
- Racosperma gittinsii (Pedley) Pedley; Acacia linifolia auct. non (Vent.) Willd.: White, C.T. (1939)

= Acacia gittinsii =

Species of legume

Acacia gittinsii is a species of flowering plant in the family Fabaceae and is endemic to south-eastern Queensland, Australia. It is a graceful shrub, similar to A. ruppii.

== Description ==
Acacia gittinsii is a graceful shrub that typically grows to a height of 1–2 m (3 ft 3 in – 6 ft 7 in) and is similar to A. ruppii except that its phyllodes are linear to narrowly linear, 10–30 mm (0.39–1.18 in) long, 0.6–1.2 mm (0.024–0.047 in) wide, its flowers borne in six to fifteen heads in racemes 20–50 mm (0.79–1.97 in) long with slender and sparsely to moderately hairy peduncles, each head 4–5 mm (0.16–0.20 in) in diameter with about 20 flowers. Its pods are slightly glaucous and glabrous to subglabrous.

== Taxonomy ==
Acacia gittinsii was first formally described in 1964 by Leslie Pedley in the Proceedings of the Royal Society of Queensland from specimens collected by Clifford Halliday Gittins on the Blackdown Tableland in 1961.

== Distribution and habitat ==
This species of wattle is confined to the Blackdown Tableland where it grows on sandstone in Eucalyptus woodland, often in wetter areas.

== Conservation status ==
Acacia gittinsii is listed as of "least concern" under the Queensland Government Nature Conservation Act 1992.

== See also ==
- List of Acacia species
