= Gaagudju =

Aboriginal Australian people of northern Australia

The Gaagudju, also known as the Kakadu, are an Aboriginal Australian people of the Northern Territory. There are four clans, being the Bunitj or Bunidj, the Djindibi, and two Mirarr clans. Three languages are spoken among the Mirarr or Mirrar clan: the majority speak Kundjeyhmi, while others speak Gaagudju and others another language.

== Name and language ==
Gaagudju is a language spoken by a primary group known by that name, and a secondary group of contiguous peoples who used it as a second language, such as the Amurdak, Kundjeyhmi, Giimiyu, Bininj and Umbugarla peoples. Many of the latter ceased to speak their mother tongue in preference for Gaagudju after the 1930s, and it became in turn their first language.

== Country ==
The Gaagudju were a people of the northern Kakadu area. Baldwin Spencer identified the area around Gunbalanya (at the time called Oenpelli) as Gaagudju territory, for they happened to be the dominant group there at the time. In Norman Tindale's estimate, the Gaagudju possessed estates covering inland of the Van Diemen Gulf some 6,000 square kilometres (2,300 sq mi) between the eastern and southern Alligator Rivers, and running southwards as far as the mountain country. They were resident at both Cannon Hill and Mount Basedow.

== Social organisation ==
The Gaagudju were divided into four estate-owning clans, the Bunidj, the Djindibi (around Munmalarri), and two Mirarr clans.

Three languages are spoken among the Mirrar or Mirarr clan group apart from English. The majority speak Kundjeyhmi.

== History of contact ==
The Cobourg cattle company took up a lease for hunting buffalo in the Alligator River area in 1876, and Aboriginal people were a major part of the workforce. The Gaagudju, with the arrival of the feral buffalo hunter Paddy Cahill in their area in the 1880s, were employed by him in tracking and harvesting kills of this introduced animal. For many decades they dominated the industry. There was a dramatic population collapse in that area for the next three decades (1880-1920) due to introduced diseases and new colonial land use.

Most of the material collected by Baldwin Spencer over two months on the people of Oenpelli reflects a Gaagudja perspective, since Spencer's main informant, Cahill, happened to be fluent in that language and was an intermediary between Spencer and the three Indigenous informants, Mitcheralaka (Madjirrilaaga) of the Mirarr clan, Kopereiki (Gabhirrigi) of the Bunidj clan, and Wardiirdi, also of the Bunidj, and Wudeirti, but at the same time Spencer realised that several other Aboriginal peoples were present at Oenpelli and that Cahill's Gaagudeju testimony covered their distinct traditions as well.

After Cahill's death the Gaahudju shifted to the Alice and Mary River areas, to continue buffalo hunting, and gradually Oenpelli was occupied by the Kunwinjku, who moved in from the west.

== Notable people ==
- Big Bill Neidjie, last surviving speaker of the Gaagudju language and elder of the Bunitj clan

== Sources ==
- Clinch, M. A. (1979). "Cahill, Patrick (Paddy) (1863–1923)". Australian Dictionary of Biography. Vol. 7. Melbourne University Press.
- Eylmann, Erhard (1908). Die Eingeborenen der Kolonie Südaustralien (PDF). Berlin: D.Reimer – via Internet Archive.
- Harvey, Mark (2002). A Grammar of Gaagudju. Walter de Gruyter. ISBN 978-3-110-87128-9.
- "Mirarr". Gundjeihmi Aboriginal Corporation. n.d.
- "Mirarr - Indigenous Peoples". Intercontinental Cry. Center for World Indigenous Studies. n.d.
- Spencer, Baldwin (1914). Native tribes of the Northern Territory of Australia (PDF). London: Macmillan Publishers – via Internet Archive.
- Spencer, Baldwin (1928). Wanderings in wild Australia. London: Macmillan Publishers – via Internet Archive.
- Tindale, Norman Barnett (1974). "Kakadu (NT)". Aboriginal Tribes of Australia: Their Terrain, Environmental Controls, Distribution, Limits, and Proper Names. Australian National University. ISBN 978-0-708-10741-6. Archived from the original on 20 March 2020.
