= Alligator Rivers =

River delta in northern Australia

Alligator
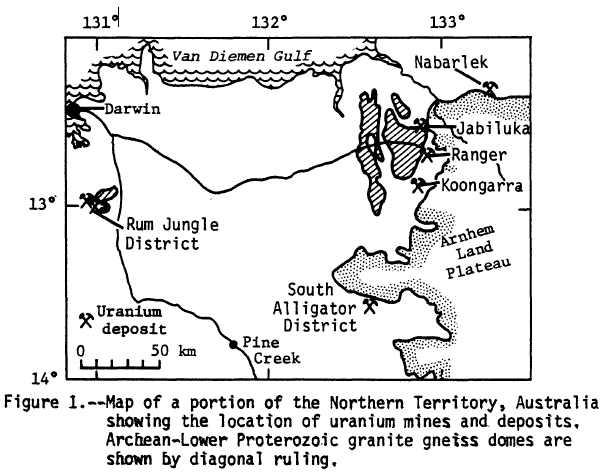
- Location of key Northern Territory uranium mines

- Location of the South Alligator River mouth in the Northern Territory

Location
- Country: Australia
- Territory: Northern Territory

Physical characteristics
- Mouth
  - location: Australia
  - coordinates: 12°14′22″S 132°24′11″E

Alligator Rivers is the name of an area in an Arnhem Land region of the Northern Territory of Australia, containing three rivers, the East, West, and South Alligator Rivers. It is regarded as one of the richest biological regions in Australia, with part of the region in the Kakadu National Park. It is an Important Bird Area (IBA), lying to the east of the Adelaide and Mary River Floodplains IBA. It also contains mineral deposits, especially uranium, and the Ranger Uranium Mine is located there. The area is also rich in Australian Aboriginal art, with 1500 sites. The Kakadu National Park is one of the few World Heritage sites on the list because of both its natural and human heritage values. They were explored by Lieutenant Phillip Parker King in 1820, who named them in the mistaken belief that the crocodiles in the estuaries were alligators.

== Rivers ==
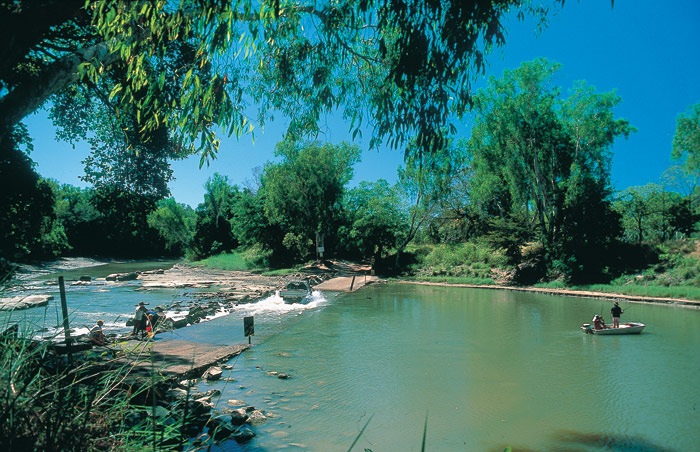
East Alligator River Crossing (Cahills Crossing)

The East Alligator River is about 160 km (99 mi) long. After rising in the northern part of the Arnhem Land Plateau, it flows with tributary streams towards the northwest, through canyons towards the Van Diemen Gulf, which it meets at Point Farewell. The river has a total catchment area of 15,876 km^{2} (6,130 sq mi) and has many tributaries, including Magela Creek, Tin Camp Creek, and Cooper Creek. The catchment is surrounded by the South Alligator River catchment to the west and Goomadeer and Liverpool River catchments to the east and the Daly River catchment to the south. The river has an annual average discharge of 6,870 gigalitres (8.986×10^{9} cu yd) per year.

The South Alligator River is also about 160 km (99 mi) long. It rises north of Mount Stow, on the Arnhem Land Plateau. It flows northwesterly in a valley containing a number of disused uranium mines developed between 1955 and 1965. It also flows out into the Van Diemen Gulf of the Timor Sea. The catchment area occupies an area of 11,917 km^{2} (4,601 sq mi) and has the East Alligator River catchment to the east, the Wildman and Mary River catchments to the west, and the Daly River catchment to the south.

The West Alligator River rises in the lowlands and is 80 km (50 mi). The Wildman River also flows in the region. The river system has a number of spectacular waterfalls, including the Jim Jim Falls on Jim Jim Creek and the Twin Falls on Twin Falls Creek.

The rivers have created the alluvial plains, including the mangrove swamps, in the past 20,000 years.

== Climate ==
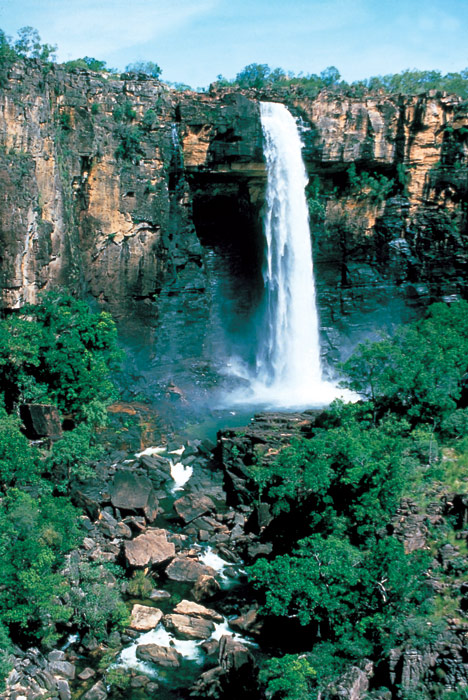
Waterfall - Kakadu National Park after rain

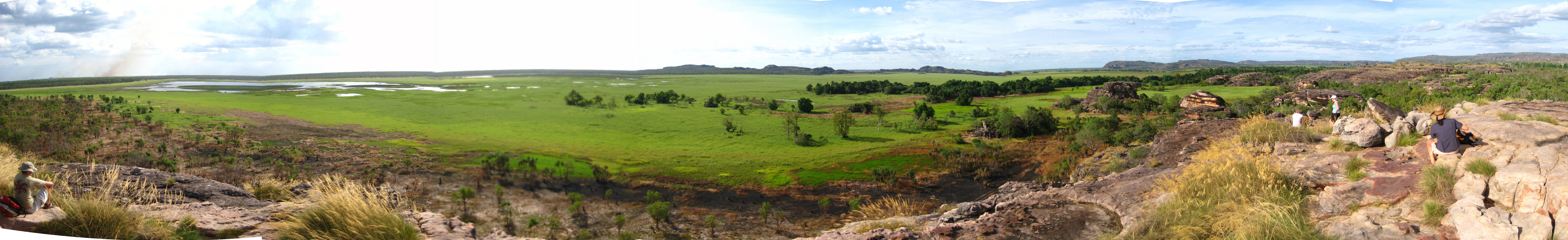
Panorama from Ubirr Rock

Like much of northern Australia, the Alligator Rivers region has a monsoon climate. The dry season lasts between May and September while the wet season lasts between November and March. April and October are transitional periods between the two seasons. Annual rainfall at Jabiru is around 1.54 m (5.1 ft), with almost all of it falling during the wet season. During the wet season, the prevailing winds are westerly to northwesterly, while they are easterly to southeasterly during the dry season.

The three Alligator Rivers are perennial rivers flowing even during the dry season, as is the Wildman River. All of the tributaries dry up in places during that period. The land dries out, and the wildlife concentrates around the permanent water sources such as the rivers, springs, waterholes, and billabongs. The duration of the dry period depends on the rainfall during the wet season. In a normal year, the tributaries start flowing around the middle of December and finish at the end of June, but the flow starts in November and finishes in August if the rainfall has been particularly heavy.

During the wet season, the savanna turns green, the wildlife spreads out, the bird life returns, and the streams flood into adjacent lands turning them into swamps. The flood plains leave behind silt when they gradually dry up during the wet season.

During the wet season, the water has a higher temperature and is relatively low in turbidity. In the dry season, an increase in turbidity occurs, especially in the shallower water sources.

The Alligator Rivers region is also subject to cyclones between October and May, like other parts of the Australian Indian Southeast region.

== Wildlife ==
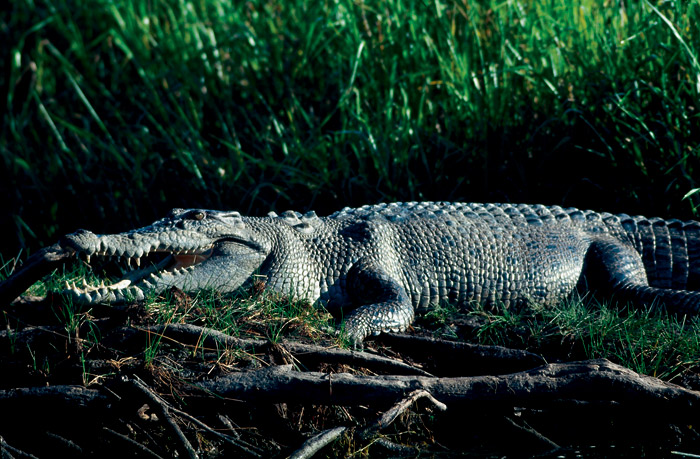
Salt water crocodile - Kakadu National Park

The region takes its name from the crocodiles in the lower reaches of the rivers. However, the region features a wide diversity of plant and animal habitats. More than 1,500 species of plants have been recorded in a range of tropical habitats including mangrove, monsoon forest, tropical grassland, and woodland. The 46 species of fish in the river system represent about a quarter of all known species existing in Australia.

The region also features high populations of the dusky rat and its predator the water python. New vertebrate species are still being discovered in the region, notably the Kakadu dunnart and the Kakadu Pebble-mound Mouse. The potential for discovery of invertebrate species, such as ants is even greater.

Some threat to the ecosystems exists from introduced flora and fauna. Introduced species of plants such as the giant sensitive plant (Mimosa pigra) and mission grass are threatening habitats. Invasive species such as feral water buffalo and cane toads are also causing problems.

=== Birds ===
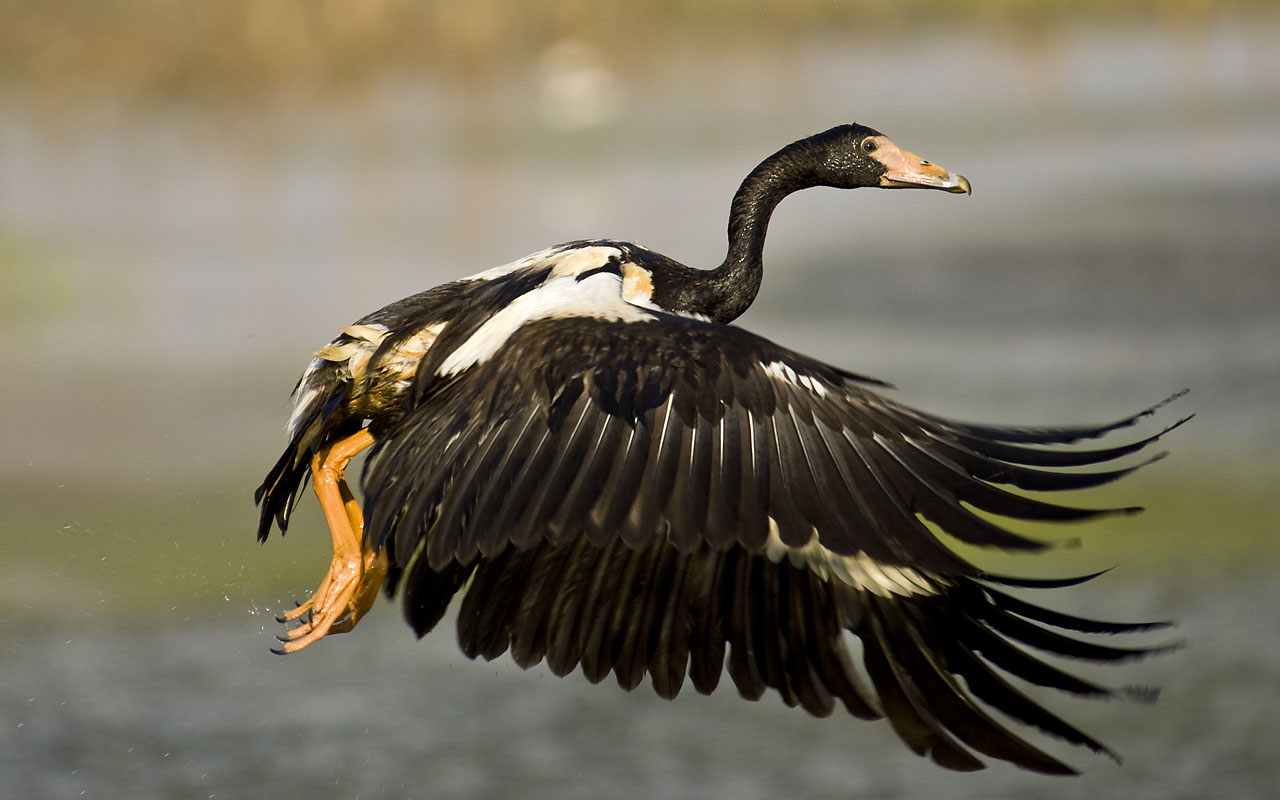
The Alligator Rivers floodplains are of world importance for magpie geese.

The region features a wide variety of birdlife, with over one in three of Australia's species having been sighted in the region. In particular, the Alligator Rivers area is known for its rich collection of waterfowl such as magpie geese, ducks, herons, ibises, and spoonbills. The Alligators Rivers floodplains form a 383,000-ha IBA which it is estimated to support some five million waterbirds, including over 1% of the global population of 22 species, significant numbers of three near threatened species, with another 11 restricted-range or savanna-biome-restricted species.

== Aboriginal culture ==
Aboriginal people have lived continuously in the Alligator Rivers region for 50,000 years. The region accordingly has a rich heritage with cave paintings and rock carvings common with over 1500 sites. Many Aboriginal artefacts have been found in old camping grounds in the region.

The southern part of Kakadu contains a number of sites relating to Bula, a god associated with creation, and these sites are considered to be both sacred and dangerous to the aboriginal people because of this association. Also, art relating to contact with Makassan traders and Europeans is found there.

At Ubirr Rock near Cahill's Crossing on the East Alligator River, some paintings dating from 20,000 years ago have figures throwing spears and wearing headdresses to first contact with European settlement.

The Gagudju people live in the area between the East and South Alligator Rivers. They share responsibility for Kakadu National Park which lies within their country. Gunbalanya (formerly Oenpelli), a settlement in the area, is run by an Aboriginal council and is an important centre for arts and crafts. The Gagudju language is no longer widely spoken, but was common until the early 20th century.

The Jawoyn people live in the South Alligator and South Mary regions, as well as around Katherine. The Jawoyn negotiated an agreement in 1993 for the Coronation Hill uranium mine where they would allow further exploration of the area in return for employment and training for the Jawoyn and a partnership arrangement.

The Kunwinjku people live between the Liverpool River and the East Alligator River. Traditional beliefs remain important to the Kunwinjku with Ngalyod, the Rainbow Serpent, playing an important part in their art and traditions. The Kunwinjku have received royalties from the Nabarlek Uranium Mine in recent years. The Kunwinjku live in Gunbalanya and Maningrida.

== Modern history ==
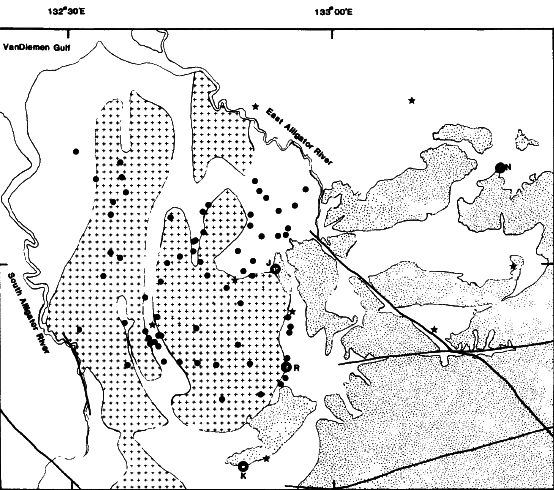
Precambrian geological map of the Pine Creek Geosyncline: Uranium deposits: R=Ranger, K=Koongarra, N=Nabarlek, and J=Jabiluka. Stippling indicates the Kombolgie Formation of Middle Proterozoic sandstones with some volcanics, crosses indicate the Nanambu Complex of Archean granites and gneisses, and the unmarked outlined region indicates the Cahill Formation of Proterozoic metamorphic rocks.

=== Exploration ===
The explorer Phillip Parker King was the first English navigator to enter the Gulf of Carpentaria. He made a number of explorations in the area between 1818 and 1822 and named the rivers after the crocodiles which he mistook for alligators as his journals note. "On our course up and down the river, we encountered several very large alligators and some were noticed sleeping on the mud. This was the first time we had seen these animals, excepting that at Goulburn Island, and, as they appeared to be very numerous and large, it was not thought safe to stop all night up the River."

Ludwig Leichhardt was the first European explorer to visit the area in 1845 en route to Port Essington. Leichhardt followed a creek down from the Arnhem Land escarpment before crossing the South and East Alligator Rivers. John McDouall Stuart also visited the area in 1862.

=== Settlement ===
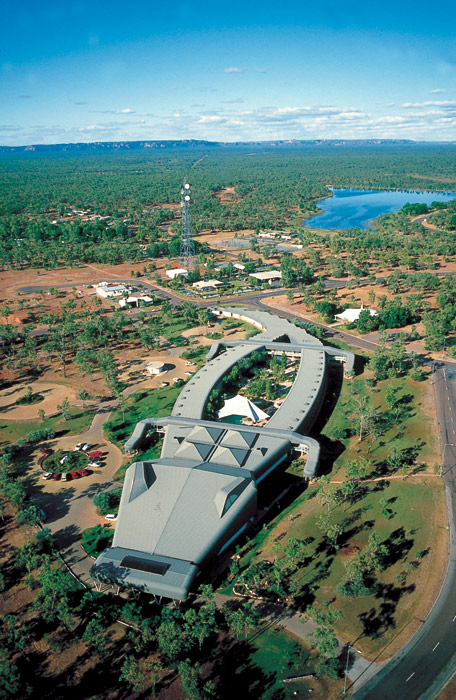
Crocodile Hotel at Jabiru

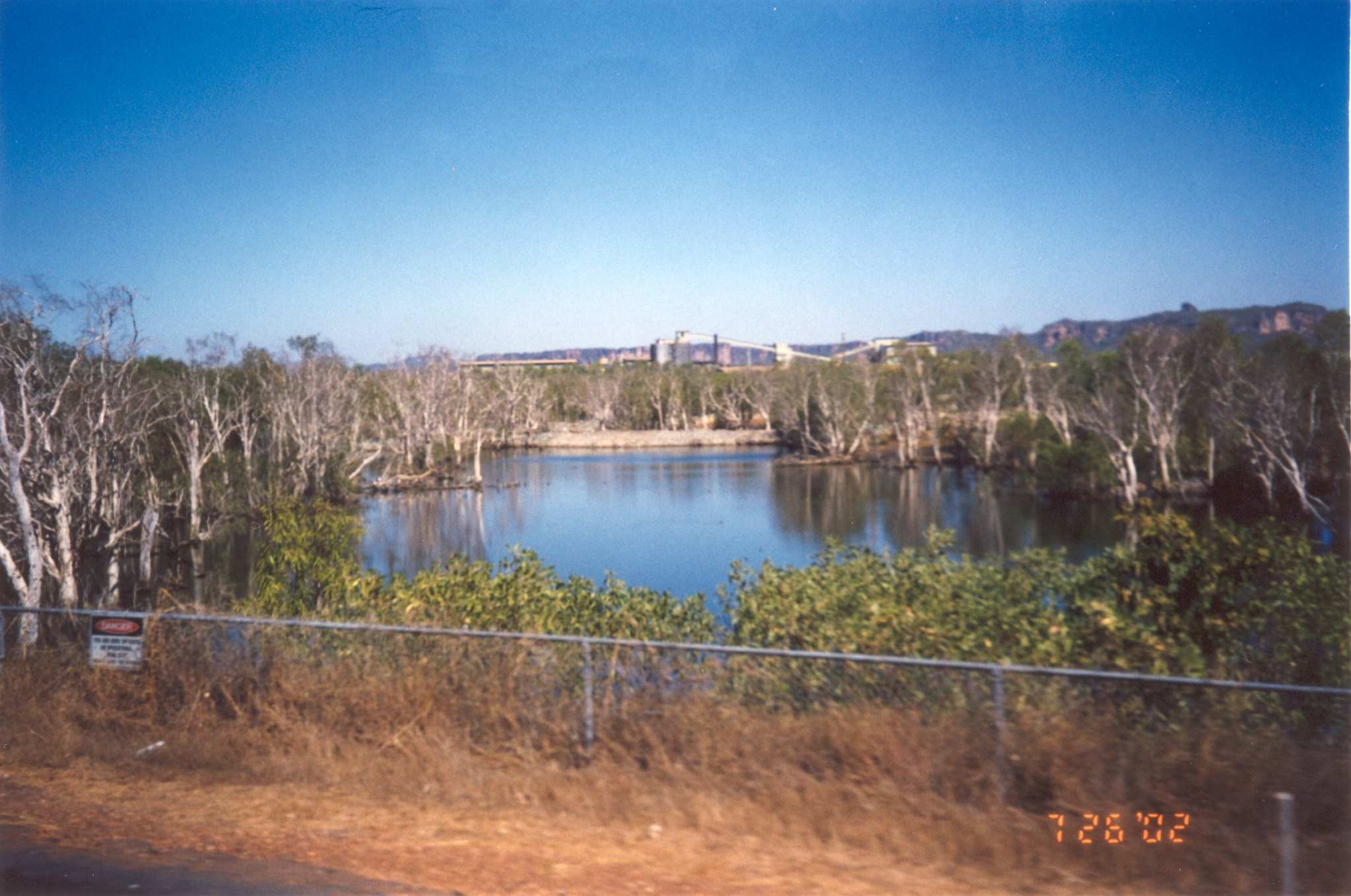
Ranger Uranium Mine viewed from the road

The settlement of the area by Europeans was slow and sporadic as it was very remote and illnesses were also a problem. The commercial harvesting of water buffalo hides and horns had begun by the 1880s. Paddy Cahill, who came to the area to set up a cattle station, was the first buffalo hunter to operate in the region. The buffalo industry lasted around 70 years until the late 1950s until the development of synthetic substitutes. Crocodile hunting was also operating in the area until the hunting of freshwater crocodile was made illegal in 1964 and estuarine crocodiles in 1971.

Paddy Cahill had established his cattle station at Oenpelli by 1906, and by 1913, it had become successful. Indeed, Cahill's success at Oenpelli was often cited as an example for others to follow. Other stations were set up, but did not always enjoy the same success. Goodparla operated as a cattle and buffalo station and operated with mixed success until the federal government acquired the land as part of Kakadu National Park.

Missionaries provided much of the schooling for the Aboriginal people for much of the 20th century. The Kapalga Native Industrial Mission was established in 1899 near the South Alligator River, but only lasted four years. The Church of England Missionary Society established a mission station in 1925 at Oenpelli which lasted for 45 years. In 1975, an Aboriginal town council took over responsibility for running the township of Oenpelli.

Small-scale gold mining started in the region in the 1920s at Imarlkba near Barramundi Creek and at Moline in the 1930s. However, the discovery of uranium at the headlands of the South Alligator River in 1953 started the mining industries. By 1957, 13 uranium mines were operating, employing 150 people including at Coronation Hill. Following the discovery of large uranium mines at Jabiluka, Ranger, Nabarlek, and Koongarra, the federal government established the Ranger Uranium Environmental Inquiry otherwise known as the Fox Inquiry which recommended the development of the Ranger site, consideration of the other two sites, and establishment of Jabiru as a support centre. Royalties are paid to the traditional owners in compensation for the loss of their country.

== See also ==
- List of rivers of Australia § Northern Territory
