= Jim Jim Falls =

Waterfall in the Northern Territory, Australia

Jim Jim Falls Barrkmalam
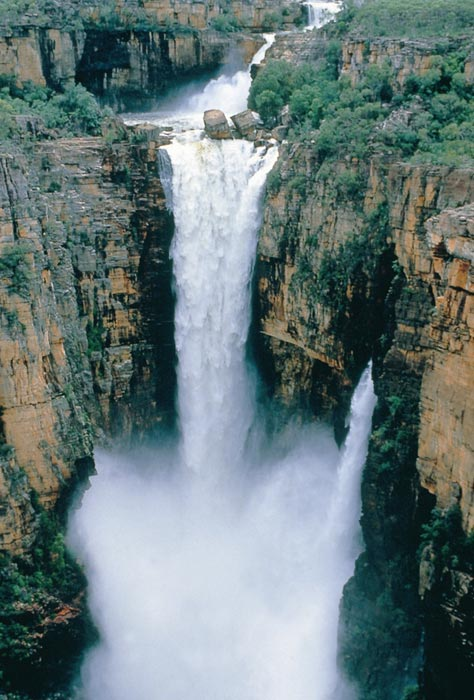
- Jim Jim Falls during the wet season, Kakadu National Park

- Location within Northern Territory
- Location: Arnhem Land, Northern Territory, Australia
- Coordinates: 13°16′20″S 132°50′22″E
- Type: Plunge
- Elevation: 259 metres (850 ft) AHD
- Total height: 140–200 metres (460–660 ft)
- Number of drops: 1
- Watercourse: Jim Jim Creek

The Jim Jim Falls (Aboriginal: Barrkmalam) is a plunge waterfall on the Jim Jim Creek that descends over the Arnhem Land escarpment within the UNESCO World Heritage–listed Kakadu National Park in the Northern Territory of Australia. The Jim Jim Falls area is registered on the Australian National Heritage List.

== Etymology ==
The English name "Jim Jim Falls" comes from the local Kundjeyhmi word andjimdjim, referring to the water pandanus (Pandanus aquaticus), a native plant. Andjimdjim (or mandjimdjim in the neighbouring Kunwinjku language) lines the creek below Jim Jim Falls.

== Location and features ==
The waterfall descends from an elevation of 259 metres (850 ft) above sea level via one drop that ranges in height between 140 and 200 metres (460 and 660 ft) into a plunge pool within the creek. The falls are located near the eastern boundary of the national park and 28 kilometres (17 mi) south of Jabiru. In the dry season, access from the Kakadu Highway is possible via a 60-kilometre (37 mi) gravel road, with the final 11 kilometres (6.8 mi) suitable for four-wheel drive vehicles only. However, during much of this period the falls dry up and do not flow. In the wet season when the falls are at their most spectacular, it is impossible to drive any vehicle into the area and are best viewed from the air together with the nearby Twin Falls.

140 million years ago much of Kakadu was under a shallow sea. The prominent escarpment wall formed sea cliffs and the Arnhem Land plateau formed a flat land above the sea. Today the escarpment, which rises to 330 metres (1,080 ft) above the plains, extends over 500 kilometres (310 mi) along the eastern side of the national park and into Arnhem Land. It varies from vertical cliffs in the Jim Jim Falls area to stepped cliffs and isolated outliers in the north.

== In popular culture ==
"Jim Jim Falls" is the first track on English singer Morrissey's album I Am Not A Dog On A Chain

Jim Jim Falls is mentioned in Season 5, Episode 11 of the podcast My Dad Wrote a Porno. In the episode, "A B, a B and a Q", the characters Belinda and Bella from Belinda Blinked meet Quentin who has just returned from the falls.

== See also ==
- List of reduplicated Australian place names
- List of waterfalls
- List of waterfalls in Australia
- Protected areas of the Northern Territory
