= Nabarlek Uranium Mine =

Mine in the Northern Territory of Australia

- Location in Australia
- Location: Arnhem Land, Northern Territory, Australia; 12°18′17.11″S 133°19′22.03″E
- Products: Uranium
- Production: 11,804 t
- Discovered: 1970
- Opened: 1979 (mill 1980)
- Closed: 1979 (mill 1988)
- Company: Queensland Mines Limited

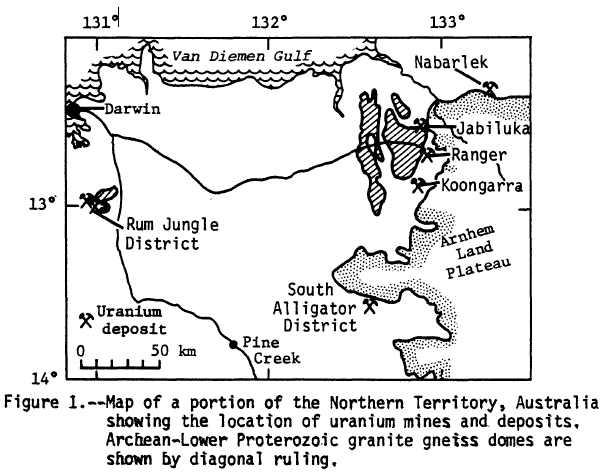
Location of key Northern Territory uranium mines

The Nabarlek Mine is a uranium mine in the Northern Territory of Australia. It was worked productively only in 1979. The deposit sits within the Alligator Rivers Uranium Field approximately 62 kilometres (39 mi) northeast of Jabiru. It was discovered by Queensland Mines Limited in 1970 by following up an intense airborne radiometric anomaly.

== History ==
=== Discovery and financial implications ===
Prospecting rights over the future mine were first obtained by Gwendolyne Stevens, a South Australian nurse and sheep farmer who had developed an interest in geology. She obtained rights over 1,282 square miles (3,320 km^{2}) of the Oenpelli Aboriginal reserve and named the area "nabarlek" after a local marsupial species. She negotiated an exploration program with Queensland Mines Limited, a subsidiary of Kathleen Investments Limited which owned the Mary Kathleen uranium mine in Queensland. Both companies were publicly listed, although Kathleen Investments was majority-owned by the Rio Tinto Zinc Corporation (RTZ).

In early 1970, Queensland Mines began costeaning Nabarlek, revealing visible deposits of pitchblende. One 76-centimetre (30 in) sample was found to contain 72 percent uranium oxide, compared with averages of 0.1 percent on some American and Canadian mines. News of the positive results soon leaked, and on 1 September the company's chairman Roy Hudson announced an estimated yield of 55,000 tonnes of uranium oxide at an average grade of 540 pounds (240 kg) per tonne. This sent the Queensland Mines share price to a peak of $46, up from $12 at the start of the year. It was widely reported that Nabarlek was the richest uranium deposit in the world.

In August 1971, the technical committee of QML revised its estimated yield for Nabarlek to 9,000 tonnes, leading to calls for the resignation of Hudson and a steep fall in the share price. This in turn led to the collapse of investment house Mineral Securities Limited in 1972 and contributed to the insolvency of Patrick Corporation in 1975, both of which had made considerable investments at higher prices. Finance journalist Trevor Sykes has described this situation as analogous to the Poseidon bubble of 1970. In May 1973, the original licence-holder Gwendolyne Stevens transferred her rights to Queensland Mines in exchange for a royalty agreement. She died of a cerebral haemorrhage in March 1974.

=== Relations with Indigenous landholders ===
The proposed mine site was located 200 yards (180 m) from an Aboriginal sacred site known as Gabo Djang, associated with the Dreaming related to the green ant. The traditional owners of Nabarlek consequently opposed the mine. QML initially offered $7,425 in exchange for the mineral rights, which by 1974 had grown to a package of $891,000 in cash plus a royalty valued at $13.6 million, which was rejected.

=== Mining ===
Open cut mining eventually took place between June and October 1979 with the ore stockpiled for milling. 546,437 t of ore were mined at an average grade of 1.84% U_{3}O_{8}.

The mill commenced operation in June 1980 and ran until 1988, during which time 11,084 t U_{3}O_{8} were produced. A survey in 2006 concluded that revegetation had failed. Rehabilitation work is continuing.

== See also ==
- Uranium mining in Australia
- Unconformity uranium deposits
