= Buchanania cochinchinensis =

Buchanania cochinchinensis is the name of a plant species and may refer to:

- Buchanania lanzan, a species to which the name Buchanania cochinchinensis has been misapplied
- Glycosmis cochinchinensis, a species for which Buchanania cochinchinensis is a synonym
