= Buchanania barberi =

Conservation status
- Critically Endangered (IUCN 3.1)

Scientific classification
- Kingdom: Plantae
- Clade: Tracheophytes
- Clade: Angiosperms
- Clade: Eudicots
- Clade: Rosids
- Order: Sapindales
- Family: Anacardiaceae
- Genus: Buchanania
- Species: B. barberi

Binomial name
- Buchanania barberi Gamble

Species of flowering plant

Buchanania barberi is a species of flowering plant in the family Anacardiaceae. It is a tree endemic to Nadari in Travancore District of Kerala, India. It is threatened by habitat loss.

Buchanania barberi is a small tree, growing up to 15 metres tall, which flowers between October and January. It grows in coastal moist lowland tropical forest from 20 to 125 metres elevation. It grows in association with Tabernaemontana alternifolia, Hydnocarpus pentandrus, Myxopyrum smilacifolium, Palaquium thwaitesii, Madhuca neriifolia, Piper nigrum, Dregea volubilis, and Clidemia hirta.

The species was first described by James Sykes Gamble in 1916.
