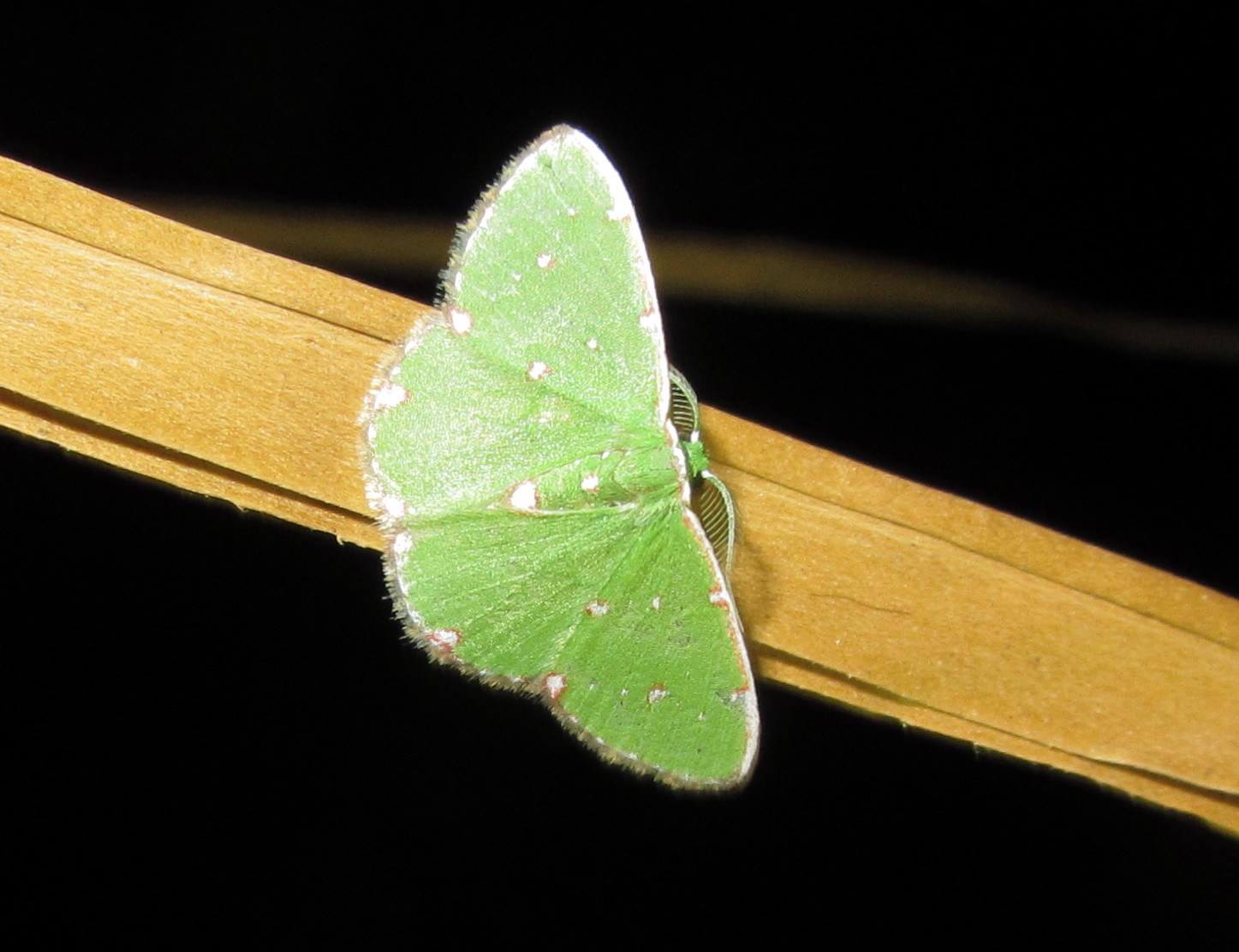

Scientific classification
- Kingdom: Animalia
- Phylum: Arthropoda
- Class: Insecta
- Order: Lepidoptera
- Family: Geometridae
- Genus: Argyrocosma
- Species: A. inductaria

Binomial name
- Argyrocosma inductaria (Guenée, 1857)

Synonyms
- Chlorochaeta inductaria Guenée, 1857; Phodoresima [sic] inductaria Guenée 1857; Eucrostis smaragdus Hampson, 1891; Probolosceles inductaria Guenée, 1898; Comibaena inductaria (Guenée, 1898)

= Argyrocosma inductaria =

Species of moth

Argyrocosma inductaria is a moth of the family Geometridae first described by Achille Guenée in 1857. It is found in Sri Lanka, India, Peninsular Malaysia and Borneo.

The species' wingspan is about 1 cm. The ground color is greenish. Its caterpillar is a light, dull green color with dorsal and lateral dark suffusions. A subdorsal white line is present. Body rugose (wrinkled) with many small conical spines. Spiracles reddish brown. Host plants are Buchanania species. Pupation occurs in a cocoon made from detritus and flower parts.

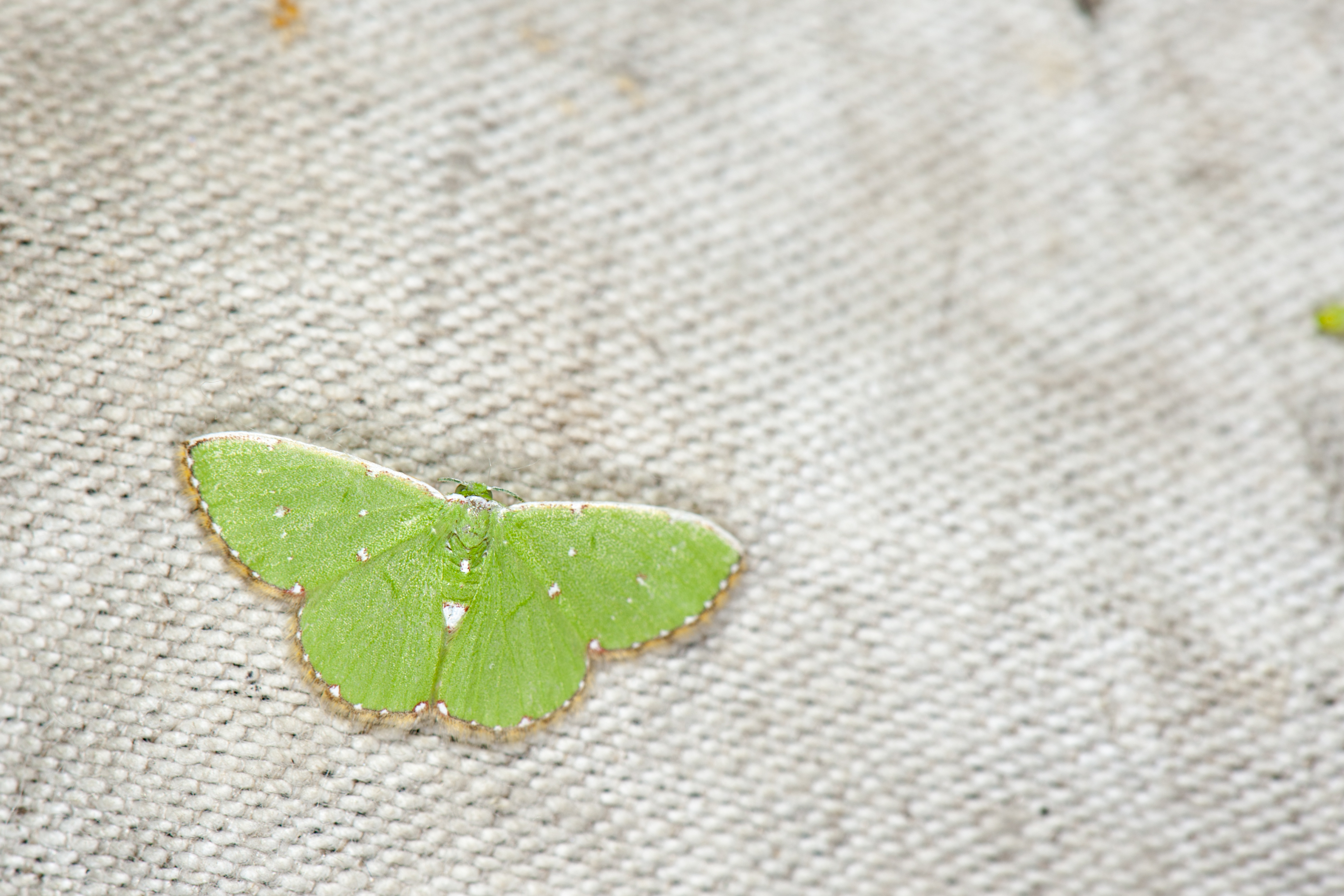

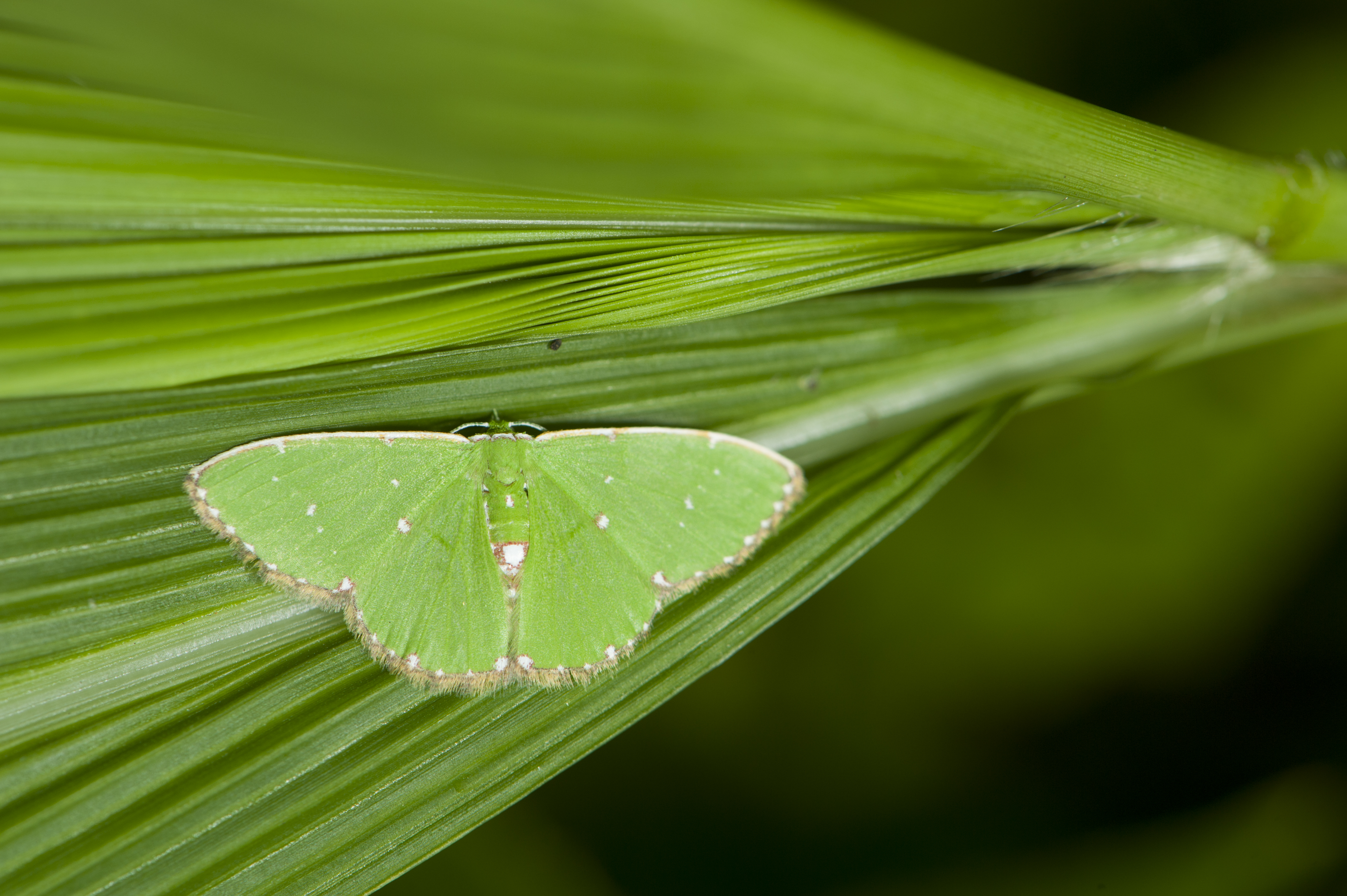

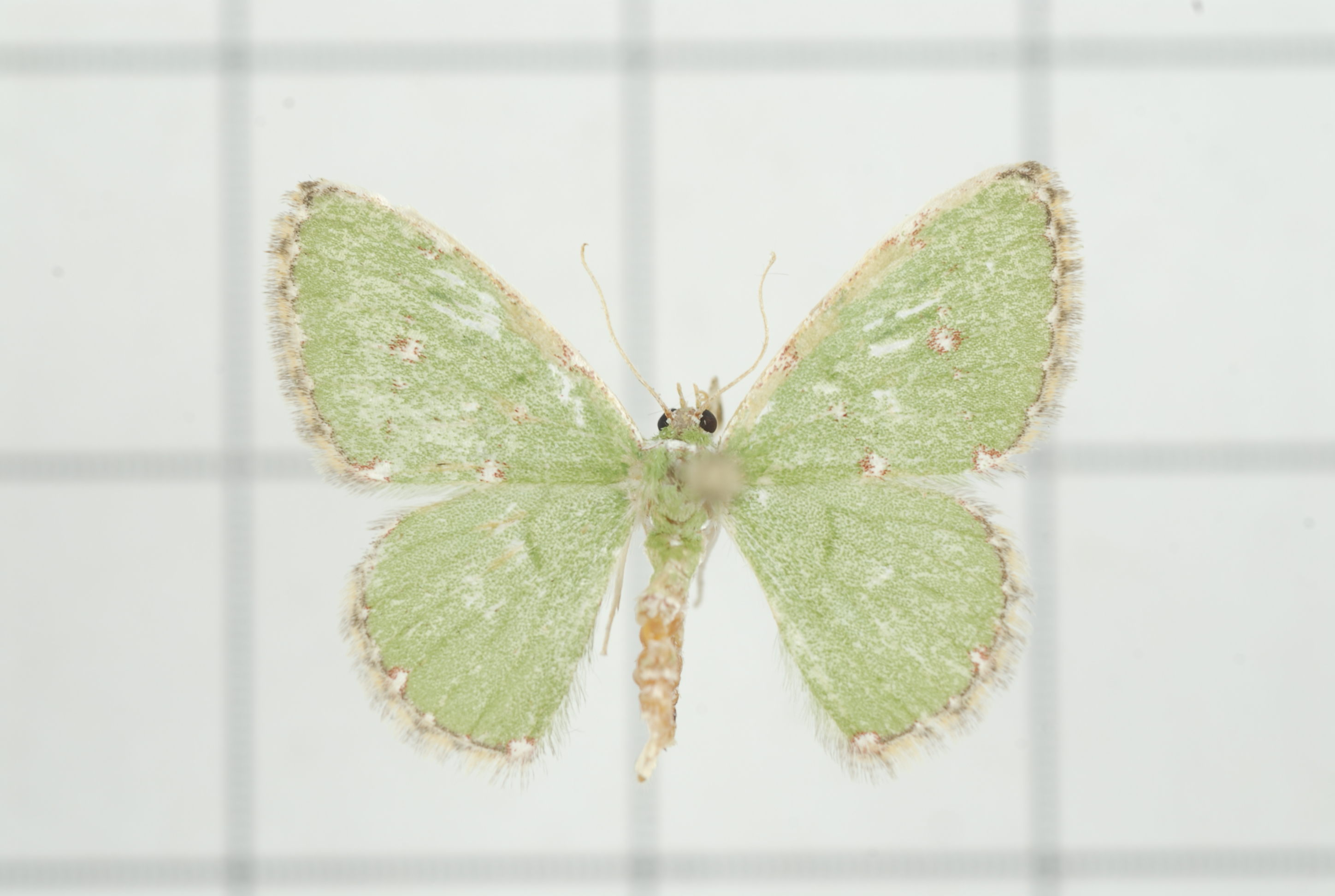

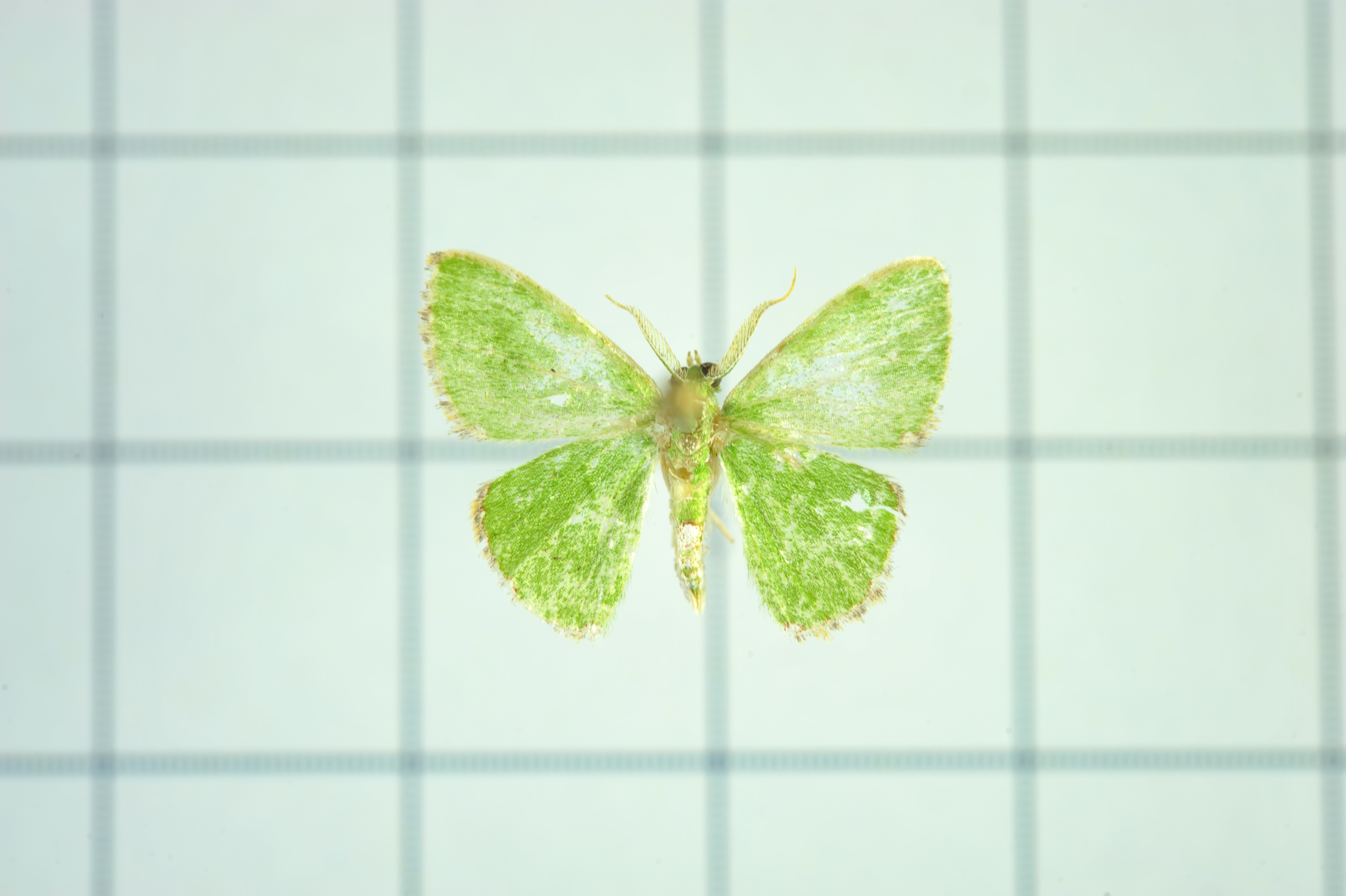
