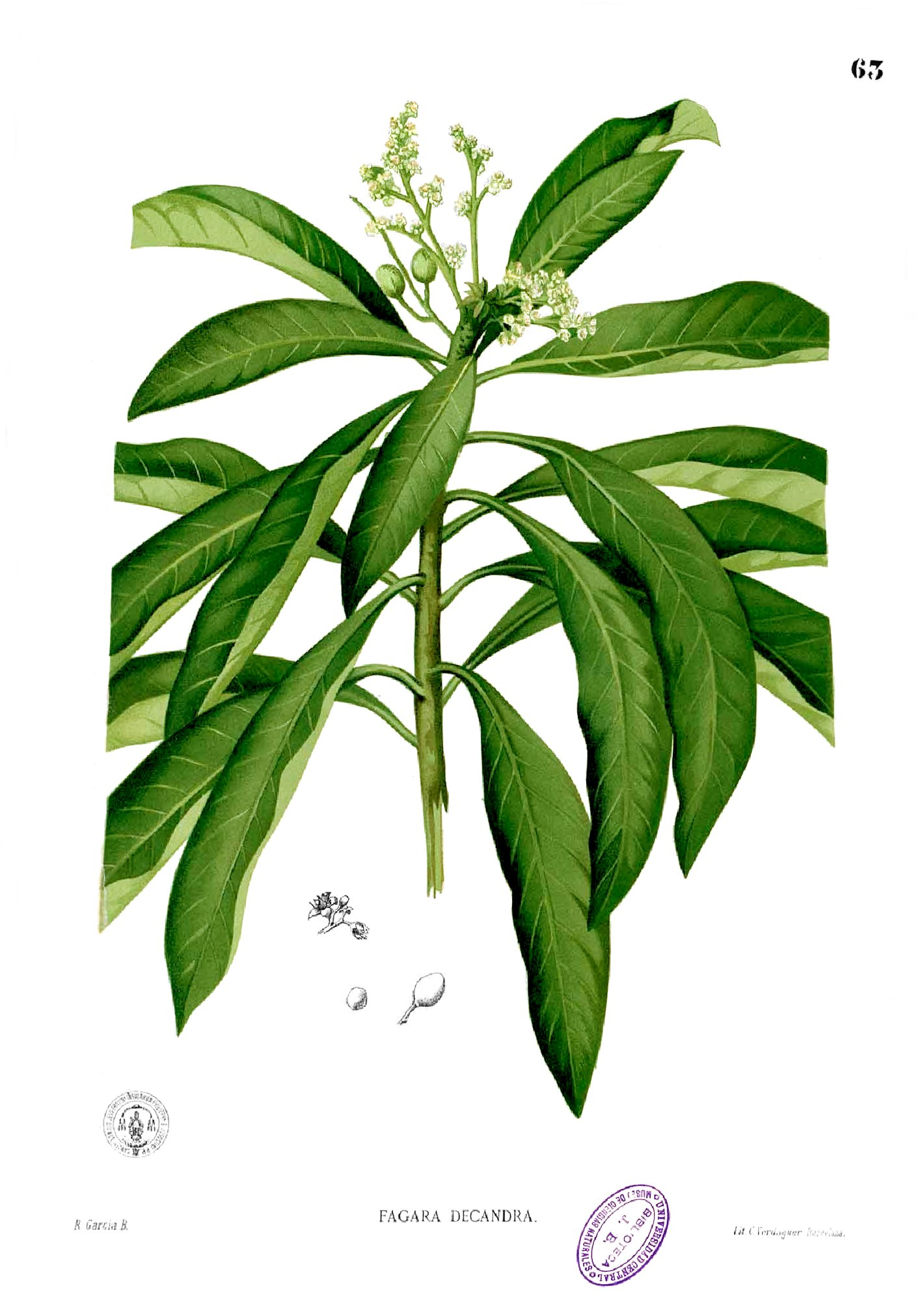
- Illustration of Fagara decandra, a synonym of Buchanania vitiensis

Scientific classification
- Kingdom: Plantae
- Clade: Tracheophytes
- Clade: Angiosperms
- Clade: Eudicots
- Clade: Rosids
- Order: Sapindales
- Family: Anacardiaceae
- Subfamily: Anacardioideae
- Genus: Buchanania; Spreng.

Type species
- Buchanania lanzan Spreng.

Species
- See text

Synonyms
- Cambessedea Kunth; Coniogeton Blume; Hypericinea Wall.; Lanzana Stokes; Loureira Meisn.; Lundia Puerari ex DC.; Toluifera Lour.

= Buchanania =

Genus of flowering plants

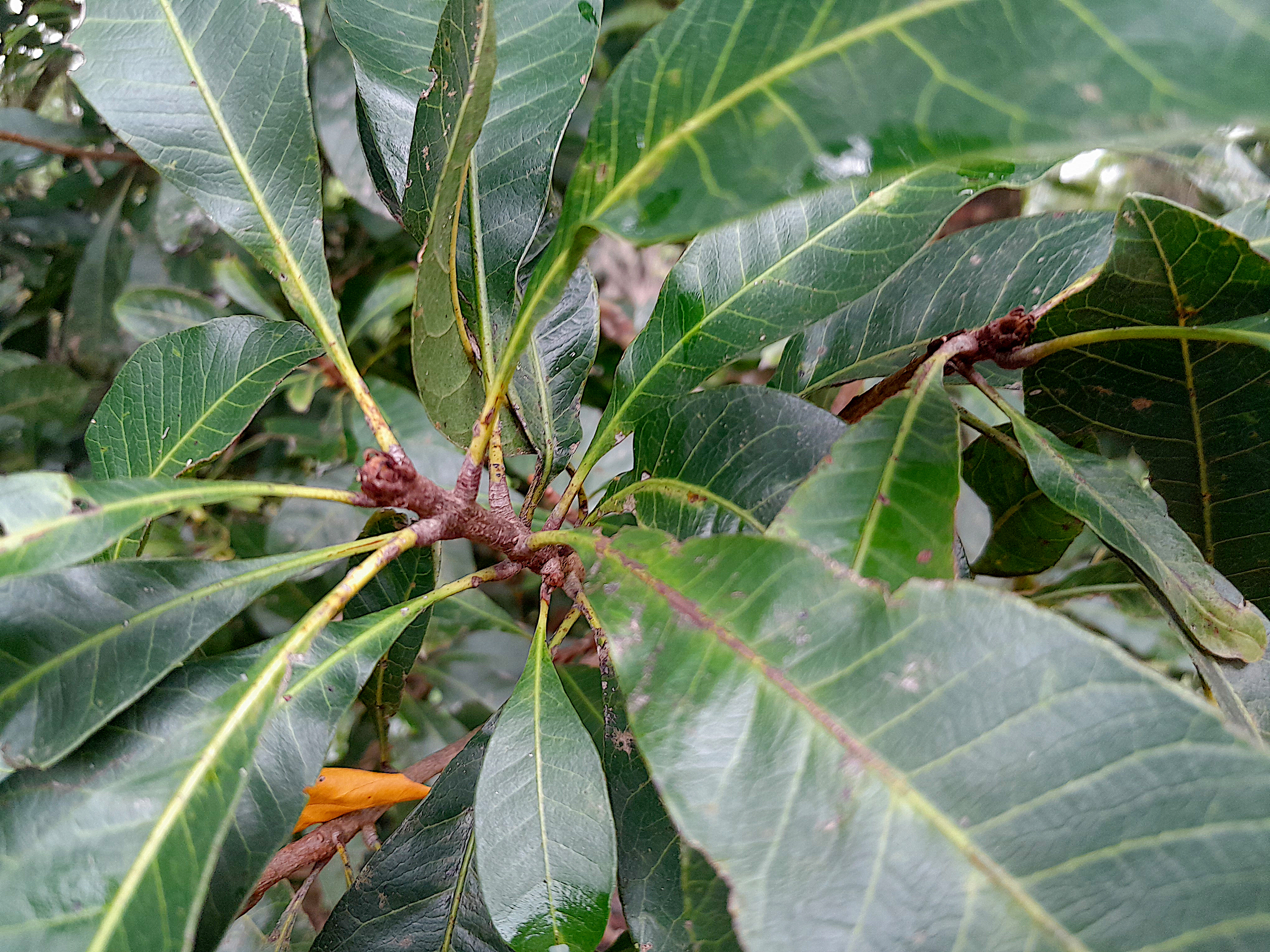
Buchanania arborescens near Cairns, Queensland

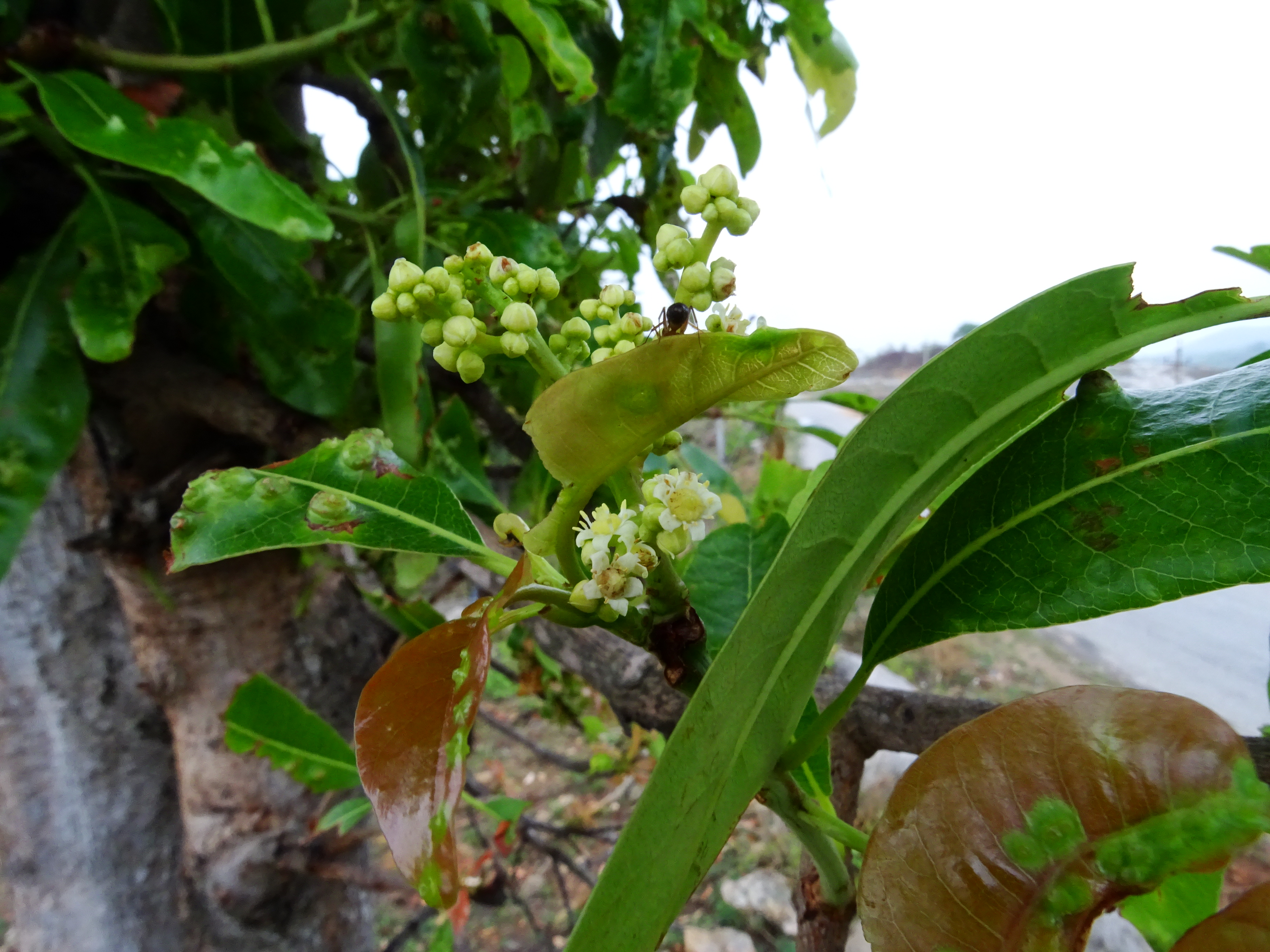
Buchanania axillaris in Bangalore, India

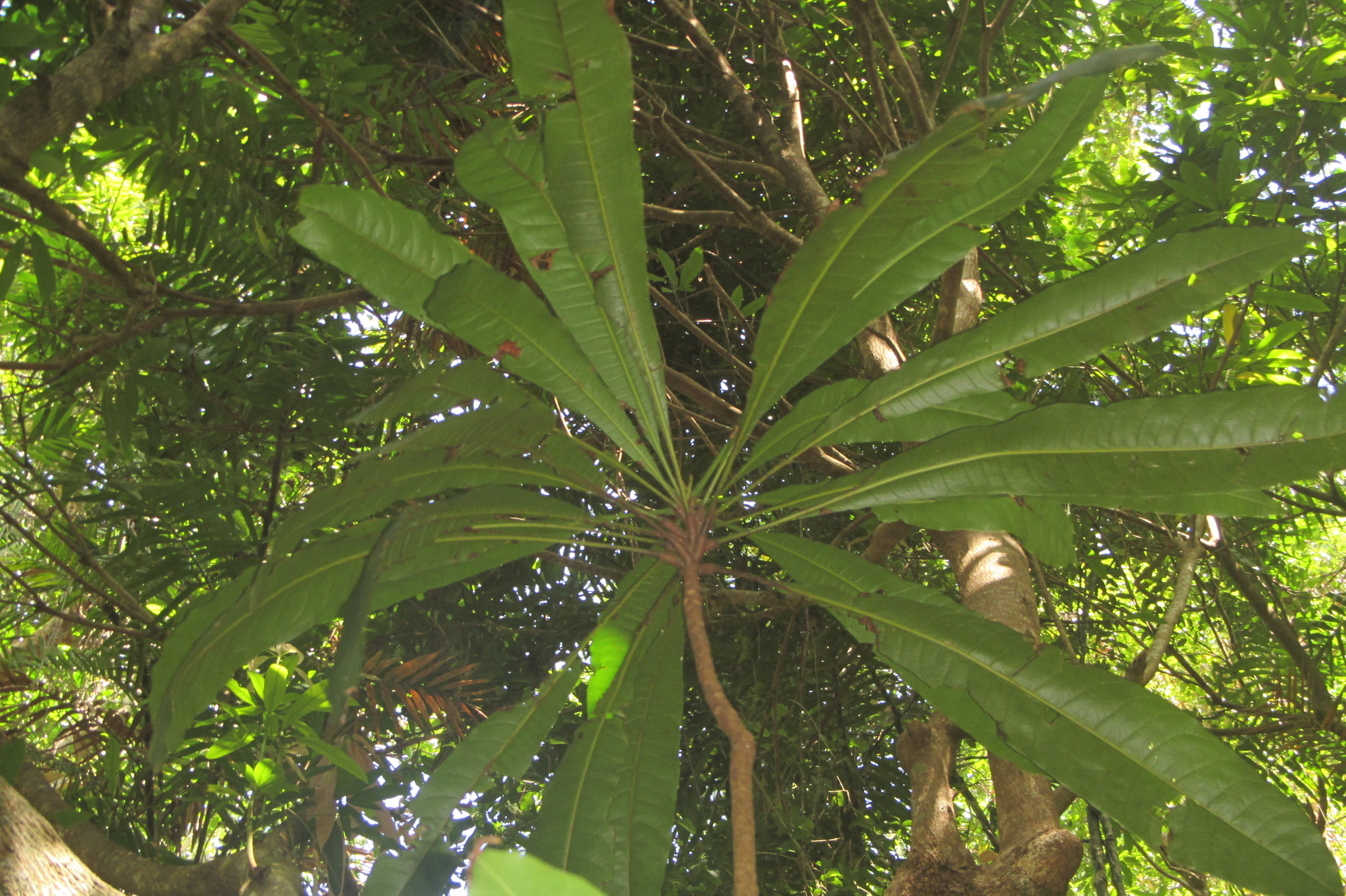
Buchanania mangoides

Buchanania is a genus of plants in the mango and cashew family Anacardiaceae, native to areas from India to southern China, and southwards to northern Australia and the western Pacific.

== Description ==
This genus consists of trees with simple, unlobed leaves arranged alternately on the twigs. Flowers are produced in axillary or terminal panicles. Flowers are bisexual, i.e. they have both male and female organs. They usually have 5 calyx lobes and 5 petals, sometimes 4 or 6, and are pale green to white. There are 10 stamens and 4–6 carpels, only one of which is fertile. Fruits are more or less lens-shaped drupes with a bony or woody endocarp, and contain a single seed. Unlike other genera in the family, Buchanania does not appear to cause contact dermatitis.

== Taxonomy ==
The genus Buchanania was erected in 1801 by German botanist Kurt Polycarp Joachim Sprengel based on a collection of plant material by Francis Buchanan-Hamilton from what is now Myanmar. The genus was named after the collector.

== Distribution ==
The genus is native to areas from South and Southeast Asia, extending to northern Australia and the western Pacific. The full distribution is as follows:

- Indian subcontinent: Assam, Bangladesh, India, Nepal, Sri Lanka, West Himalaya
- China & East Asia: China South-Central, Hainan, Taiwan,
- Indo-China: Andaman Is., Cambodia, Laos, Myanmar, Nicobar Is., Thailand, Vietnam
- Malesia: Borneo, Jawa, Lesser Sunda Is., Malaya, Maluku, Philippines, Sulawesi, Sumatera
- Papuasia: Bismarck Archipelago, New Guinea, Solomon Is.
- Australia: Northern Territory, Queensland, Western Australia
- Western Pacific: Caroline Is., Fiji, Samoa, Santa Cruz Is., Vanuatu

== Species ==
As of 21 April 2024, Plants of the World Online recognises 26 species in the genus, as follows:

- Buchanania abrahamiana E.S.S.Kumar & Shareef – India
- Buchanania amboinensis Miq. – Maluku Islands, New Guinea, Solomon Islands
- Buchanania arborescens (Blume) Blume – India, Taiwan, tropical Asia, northern Australia, western Pacific
- Buchanania attenuata A.C.Sm. – Santa Cruz Islands, Fiji
- Buchanania axillaris (Desr.) Ramamoorthy – India, Sri Lanka
- Buchanania barberi Gamble – India
- Buchanania engleriana Volkens – Caroline Islands
- Buchanania evrardii Tardieu – Cambodia
- Buchanania ferruginea Engl. – India
- Buchanania glabra Wall. ex Engl. – India, Indo-China
- Buchanania insignis Blume – Borneo, Philippines
- Buchanania lanceolata Wight – southwestern India, Myanmar
- Buchanania lancifolia Roxb. – Andaman Islands, Bangladesh, Myanmar
- Buchanania lanzan Spreng. – Indian subcontinent, southern China, Indo-China
- Buchanania macrocarpa Lauterb. – Maluku Islands, Papuasia
- Buchanania mangoides F.Muell. – Queensland
- Buchanania merrillii Christoph. – Samoa
- Buchanania microphylla Engl. – Hainan, Philippines
- Buchanania nitida Engl. – Philippines, Maluku Islands
- Buchanania obovata Engl. – northern Australia
- Buchanania palawensis Lauterb. – Palau
- Buchanania reticulata Hance – Indo-China
- Buchanania sessifolia Blume – Assam, Indo-China, western Malesia
- Buchanania siamensis Miq. – Indo-China
- Buchanania splendens Miq. – Andaman Islands & Nicobar Islands, Sumatra, Borneo
- Buchanania vitiensis Engl. – Fiji

=== Formerly placed here ===
The following names were previously recognised as species of Buchanania.

- Buchanania cochinchinensis (Lour.) M.R.Almeida – now Glycosmis cochinchinensis (Lour.) Pierre ex Engl.
- Buchanania yunnanensis C.Y.Wu – now Spondias pinnata (L.f.) Kurz
- Buchanania zeylanica Blume – now Mangifera zeylanica (Blume) Hook.f.
