= Mudaima =

Indian medicinal tree

Mudaima is a medicinal plant or a medium sized tree. It is commonly identified as Buchanania axillaris, of family Anacardiaceae. It is an endemic species and only its kernel, seeds and grains are edible. It is in states like Andhra Pradesh, Odisha, Maharashtra and Tamil Nadu. It is used more for its medicinal properties and as timber.

A closely related species in the same genus is Buchanania lanzan, a deciduous tree with tomentose (hairy) branches. Its local name in Hindi is Chironji. Its seeds have almond-like flavour. It is grown in Madhya Pradesh, Maharashtra, Andhra Pradesh, Tamil Nadu, Kerala and Andaman Islands in India, apart from Sri Lanka and Myanmar.
