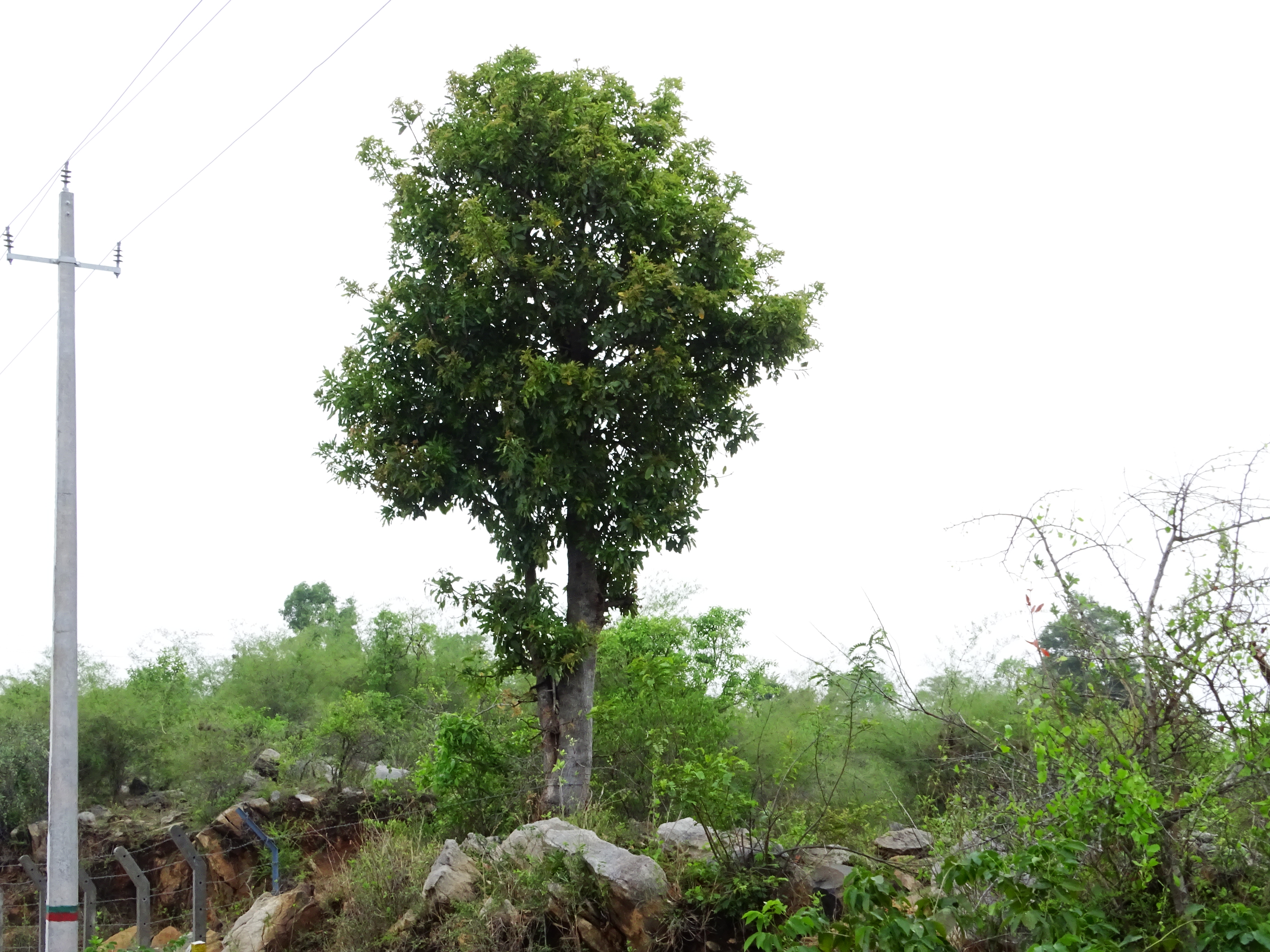

Scientific classification
- Kingdom: Plantae
- Clade: Tracheophytes
- Clade: Angiosperms
- Clade: Eudicots
- Clade: Rosids
- Order: Sapindales
- Family: Anacardiaceae
- Genus: Buchanania
- Species: B. axillaris

Binomial name
- Buchanania axillaris (Desr.) Ramamoorthy

Synonyms
- Mangifera axillaris Desr.; Buchanania angustifolia Roxb.; Cambessedea axillaris Kunth; Spondias simplicifolia Rottler

= Buchanania axillaris =

Species of flowering plant

Buchanania axillaris, the Cuddapah almond or Buchanan's mango, (മലയാളം: കുളമാവ്) is a species of flowering plant in the family Anacardiaceae. The native range of this species is India, Sri Lanka.

== Description ==
A medium sized tree, hairless, branches stout, bark rough, deeply fissured. Leaves are linear-oblong, elliptic or elliptic-lanceolate, rounded or narrow at base, entire at margin, blunt, rounded or notched at tip, 7.5–15 x 3–5 cm, smooth, netveined, lateral nerves 12–15 pairs. Leaf-stalks are 1.75 -3 cm long, slender. Flowers are 3–6 mm across, in axillary and terminal hairless branched panicles, white. Sepals are 5, semicircular, about 1 mm long. Petals are 5, oblong or ovate, about 2.5 mm long. Stamens are 10, anthers oblong, ovary hairy. Fruit is obliquely globose, about 1.25 cm, slightly compressed.

== Phenology ==
Flowering and fruiting: March–July.

== Uses ==
The kernel of the seeds are edible. The seeds contain 19% proteins, 59.1% fat, 3.8% fibres, 12.1% carbohydrates and minerals at the value of 3 grams per 100 grams and the calorific value of the seeds are 656 K kal/100 g. The seed kernel and bark is used in the form of decoction to treat intrinsic haemorrhage, diarrhoea with blood and as tonic. Seed kernels were made into a powder and used with milk as an aphrodisiac, powder of the bark mixed with honey is useful in dysentery with blood.

== See also ==
- Mudaima
