= Buchanania lanceolata =

Conservation status
- Vulnerable (IUCN 2.3)

Scientific classification
- Kingdom: Plantae
- Clade: Tracheophytes
- Clade: Angiosperms
- Clade: Eudicots
- Clade: Rosids
- Order: Sapindales
- Family: Anacardiaceae
- Genus: Buchanania
- Species: B. lanceolata

Binomial name
- Buchanania lanceolata Wight

Synonyms
- Buchanania lonchophylla Voigt

Species of flowering plant

Buchanania lanceolata is a species of flowering plant in the family Anacardiaceae. It is a tree native to Kerala in southern India and to Myanmar. In Kerala it is known from scattered collections in the southern part of the state, where it grows in lowland dipterocarp forest.
