= Buchanania splendens =

Scientific classification
- Kingdom: Plantae
- Clade: Tracheophytes
- Clade: Angiosperms
- Clade: Eudicots
- Clade: Rosids
- Order: Sapindales
- Family: Anacardiaceae
- Genus: Buchanania
- Species: B. splendens

Binomial name
- Buchanania splendens Miq.

Synonyms
- Buchanania fragrans Ridl.; Buchanania platyneura Kurz

Species of tree

Buchanania splendens is a tree in the family Anacardiaceae. The specific epithet splendens is from the Latin meaning 'shining', referring to the leaves.

== Description ==
Buchanania splendens grows as a tree up to 20 metres (70 ft) tall with a trunk diameter of up to 25 cm (10 in). Its smooth bark is grey-brown. The flowers are white. The roundish fruits measure up to 0.5 cm (0.2 in) long.

== Distribution and habitat ==
Buchanania splendens grows naturally in the Andaman and Nicobar Islands, Sumatra and Borneo. Its habitat is lowland forests.
