= Buchanania insignis =

Conservation status
- Least Concern (IUCN 3.1)

Scientific classification
- Kingdom: Plantae
- Clade: Tracheophytes
- Clade: Angiosperms
- Clade: Eudicots
- Clade: Rosids
- Order: Sapindales
- Family: Anacardiaceae
- Genus: Buchanania
- Species: B. insignis

Binomial name
- Buchanania insignis Blume

Synonyms
- Buchanania acuminatissima Merr.

Species of tree

Buchanania insignis is a tree of Borneo in the cashew and sumac family Anacardiaceae. The specific epithet insignis is from the Latin meaning 'remarkable'.

== Description ==
Buchanania insignis grows as a tree up to 25 metres (80 ft) tall with a trunk diameter of up to 40 cm (16 in). Its smooth bark is grey-white. The flowers are white. The sublentiform fruits ripen green, tinged red, and measure up to 1 cm (0.4 in) long.

== Distribution and habitat ==
Buchanania insignis grows naturally in Borneo and the Philippines. Its habitat is lowland forests, sometimes tidal swamps, to 150 m (500 ft) elevation.
