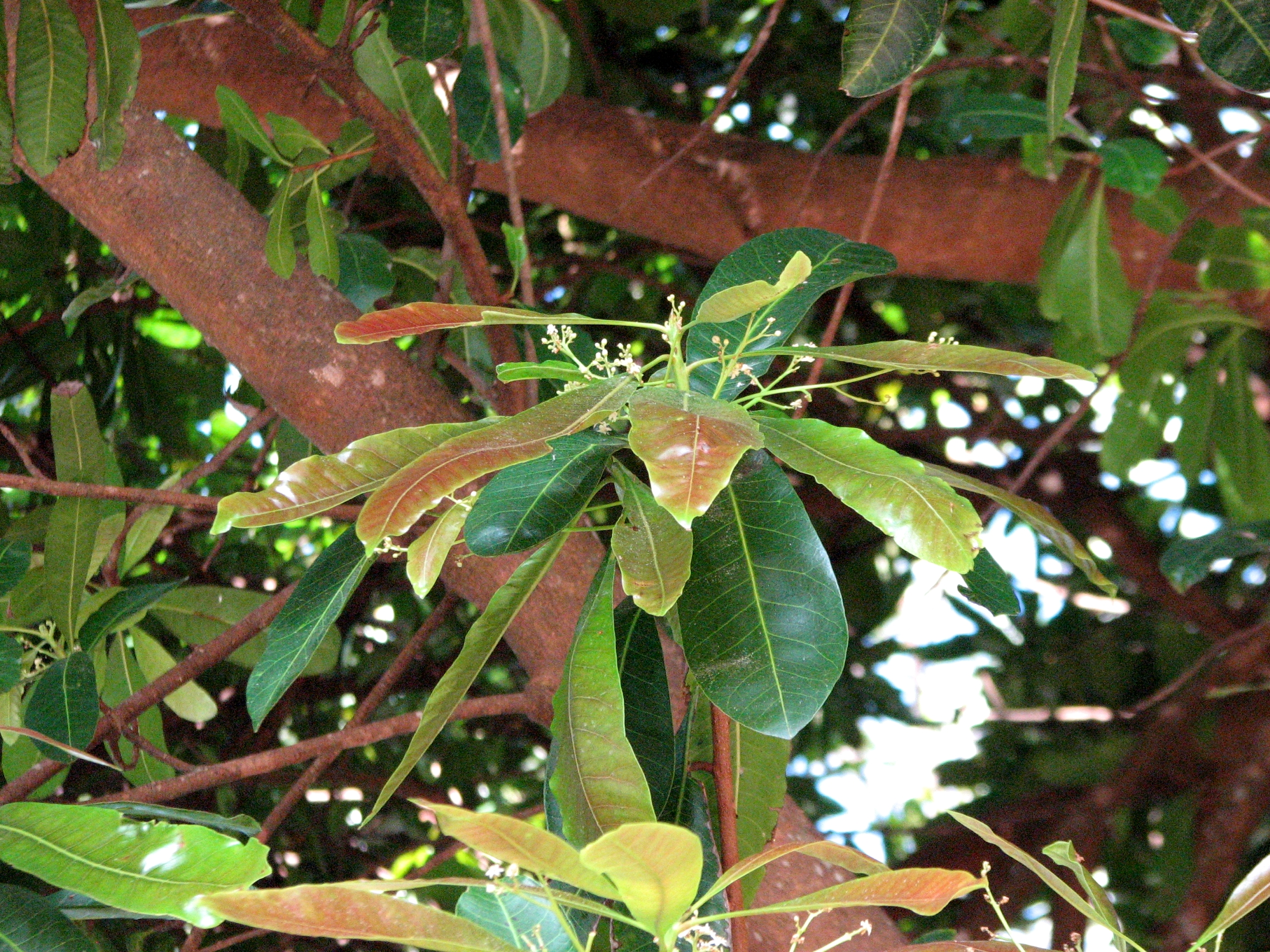

Conservation status
- Least Concern (IUCN 3.1)

Scientific classification
- Kingdom: Plantae
- Clade: Tracheophytes
- Clade: Angiosperms
- Clade: Eudicots
- Clade: Rosids
- Order: Sapindales
- Family: Anacardiaceae
- Genus: Buchanania
- Species: B. arborescens

Binomial name
- Buchanania arborescens (Blume) Blume

Synonyms
- List: Buchanania attopeuensis (Pierre) Tardieu; Buchanania bancana Miq.; Buchanania glaberrima Ridl.; Buchanania intermedia Wight; Buchanania longifolia Blume; Buchanania longifolia Span.; Buchanania lucida Blume; Buchanania monticola Kaneh. & Hatus.; Buchanania muelleri Engl.; Buchanania nabirensis Kaneh. & Hatus.; Buchanania novohibernica Lauterb.; Buchanania palembanica Blume; Buchanania papuana C.T.White; Buchanania petiolaris Miq.; Buchanania platyphylla Merr.; Buchanania polybotrya Miq.; Buchanania pseudoflorida G.Perkins; Buchanania scandens Lauterb.; Buchanania solomonensis Merr. & L.M.Perry; Buchanania subobovata Griff.; Buchanania versteeghii Merr. & L.M.Perry; Coniogeton arborescens Blume

= Buchanania arborescens =

Species of tree

Buchanania arborescens, commonly known as the little gooseberry tree or sparrow's mango, is a small and slender tree native to seasonal tropical forests of northern Australia, Southeast Asia, and the Solomon Islands.

The leaves are spirally arranged, smooth, leathery, elongated oblong, 5–26 cm long. The flowers are very small cream to yellowish white. The edible fruit are globular, small (1 cm long), reddish to purple-black. Torresian imperial pigeons and other birds eat these.

The species was formally described in 1826 by botanist Carl Ludwig Blume based on plant specimens collected from Java. Initially naming it Coniogeton arborescens, Blume transferred the species to the genus Buchanania in 1850.

In Australia the species occurs naturally across the northern extremities of the continent from Western Australia and across the Northern Territory to Queensland where it extends down the east coast as far south as Hinchinbrook Island.

== Uses ==
Aboriginal people eat the fruit raw. The plant is also used as a traditional medicine in Australia and Malaysia. The 1889 book 'The Useful Native Plants of Australia' records that "The unripe fruits of this plant were gathered, and, when boiled, imparted an agreeable acidity to the water, and when thus prepared, tasted tolerably well. When ripe, they become sweet and pulpy, like gooseberries, although their rind is not very thick. This resemblance induced us to call the tree 'the little gooseberry'tree" quoted from Leichhardt: Overland journey to Port Essington, p. 479.

== In culture ==
The tree is called balingasay in Tagalog, and in pre-colonial times were regarded as domains (dambana) of Lakan Balingasay, the anito of the tree and probably of insects (due to comparisons with Beelzebub in accounts by friars).
