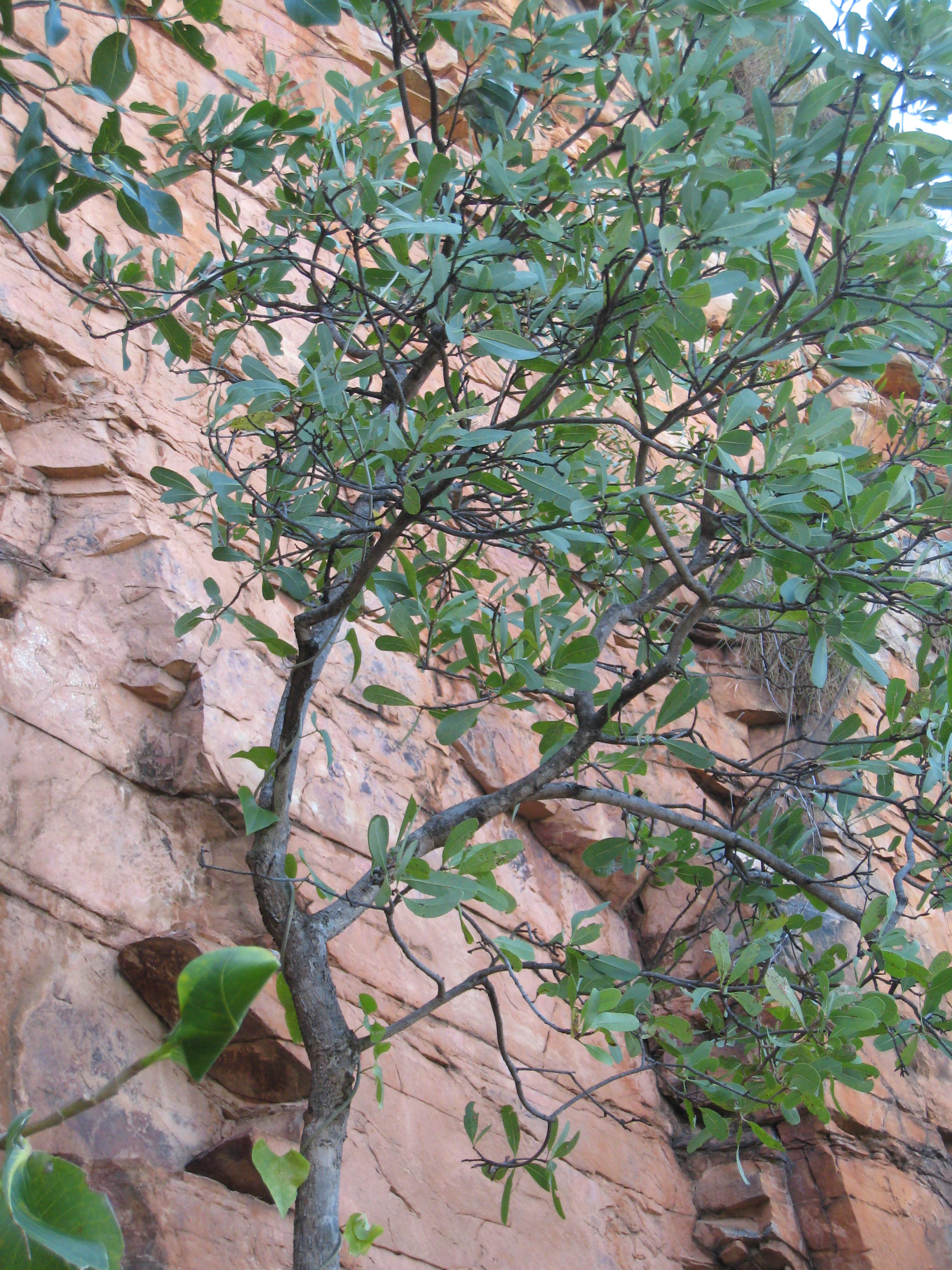

Conservation status
- Least Concern (IUCN 3.1)

Scientific classification
- Kingdom: Plantae
- Clade: Tracheophytes
- Clade: Angiosperms
- Clade: Eudicots
- Clade: Rosids
- Order: Sapindales
- Family: Anacardiaceae
- Genus: Buchanania
- Species: B. obovata

Binomial name
- Buchanania obovata Engl.

Synonyms
- Buchanania muelleri var. pilosa Engl. Buchanania oblongifolia W.Fitzg

= Buchanania obovata =

Species of flowering plant

Buchanania obovata is a small to medium-sized understorey tree in woodlands native to northern Australia, in particular in Arnhem Land in the Northern Territory. Common names include green plum and wild mango.

Leaves are smooth, thick, leathery, broadly oblong, 5–25 centimetres (2.0–9.8 in) long and 1.5–10 centimetres (0.59–3.94 in) wide. Flowers are small, cream-coloured and 0.5 centimetres (0.20 in) across. The fruit is smooth, fleshy, lens-shaped, 1–1.7 centimetres (0.39–0.67 in) long.

The species was formally described in 1883 based on plant material collected from Escape Cliffs in the Northern Territory by C. Hull.

== Uses ==
The fruit is traditionally eaten by Aboriginal people, as a bushfood. The plant also has traditional medicinal uses.

In 2020, researchers at the University of Queensland were researching the fruit. Eaten for more than 53,000 years but previously little-known among non-Indigenous people, the scientists learnt about the plum from people at the remote community of Yirrkala. It is harvested some time after the Kakadu plum harvests. Nutritional analysis showed high levels of protein, dietary fibre and the minerals potassium, phosphorus and magnesium. In addition, the folate level is among the highest of commercially available fruits. Its potential as a commercial crop for Indigenous communities is being investigated.
