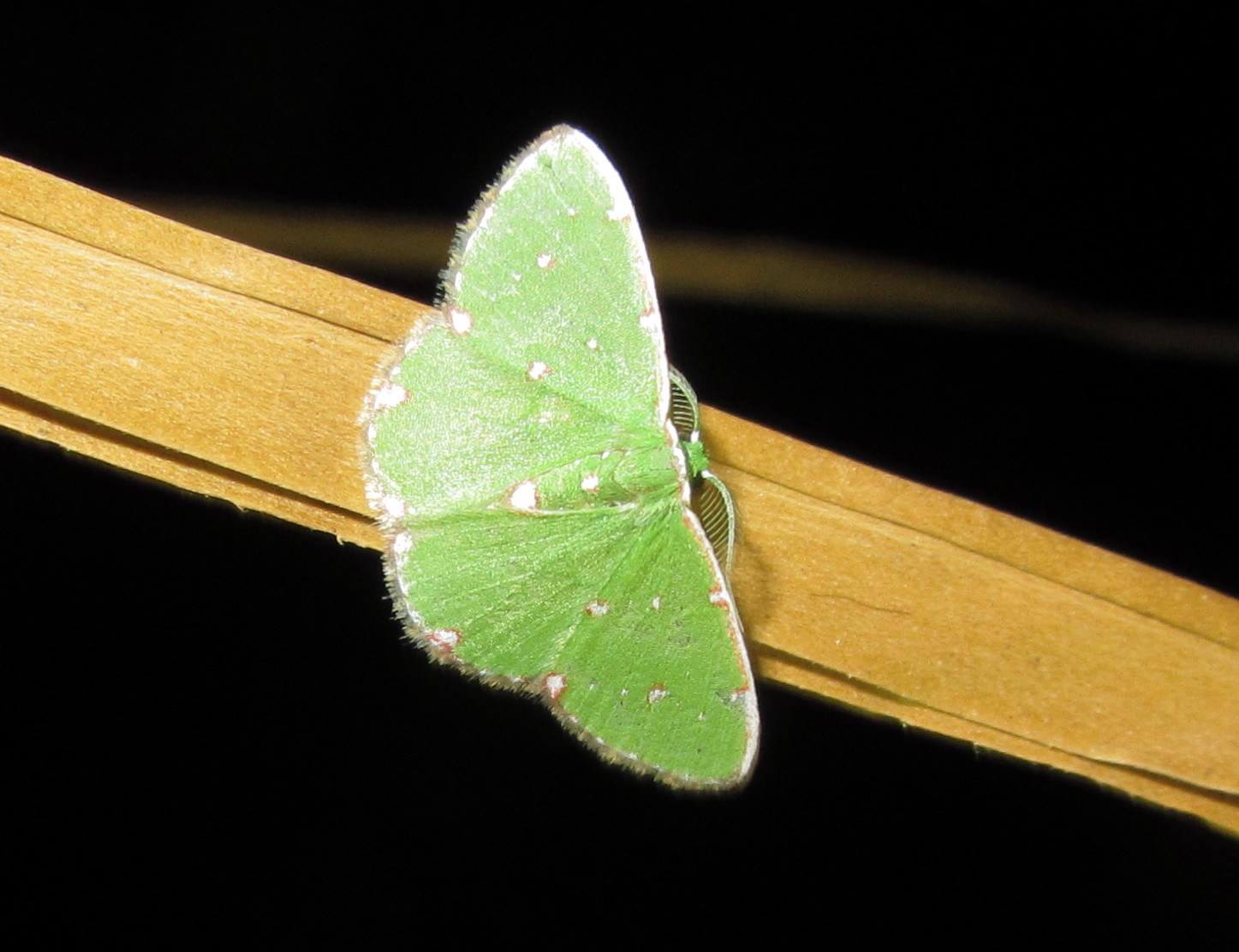
- cf. Argyrocosma inductaria

Scientific classification
- Kingdom: Animalia
- Phylum: Arthropoda
- Class: Insecta
- Order: Lepidoptera
- Family: Geometridae
- Subfamily: Geometrinae
- Genus: Argyrocosma; Turner, 1910

= Argyrocosma =

Genus of moths

Argyrocosma is a genus of moths in the family Geometridae.

== Species ==
- Argyrocosma argosticta (Turner, 1904)
- Argyrocosma consobrina (Warren, 1897)
- Argyrocosma inductaria (Guenée, 1857)
- Argyrocosma phrixopa Meyrick
- Argyrocosma strepens Prout, 1932
