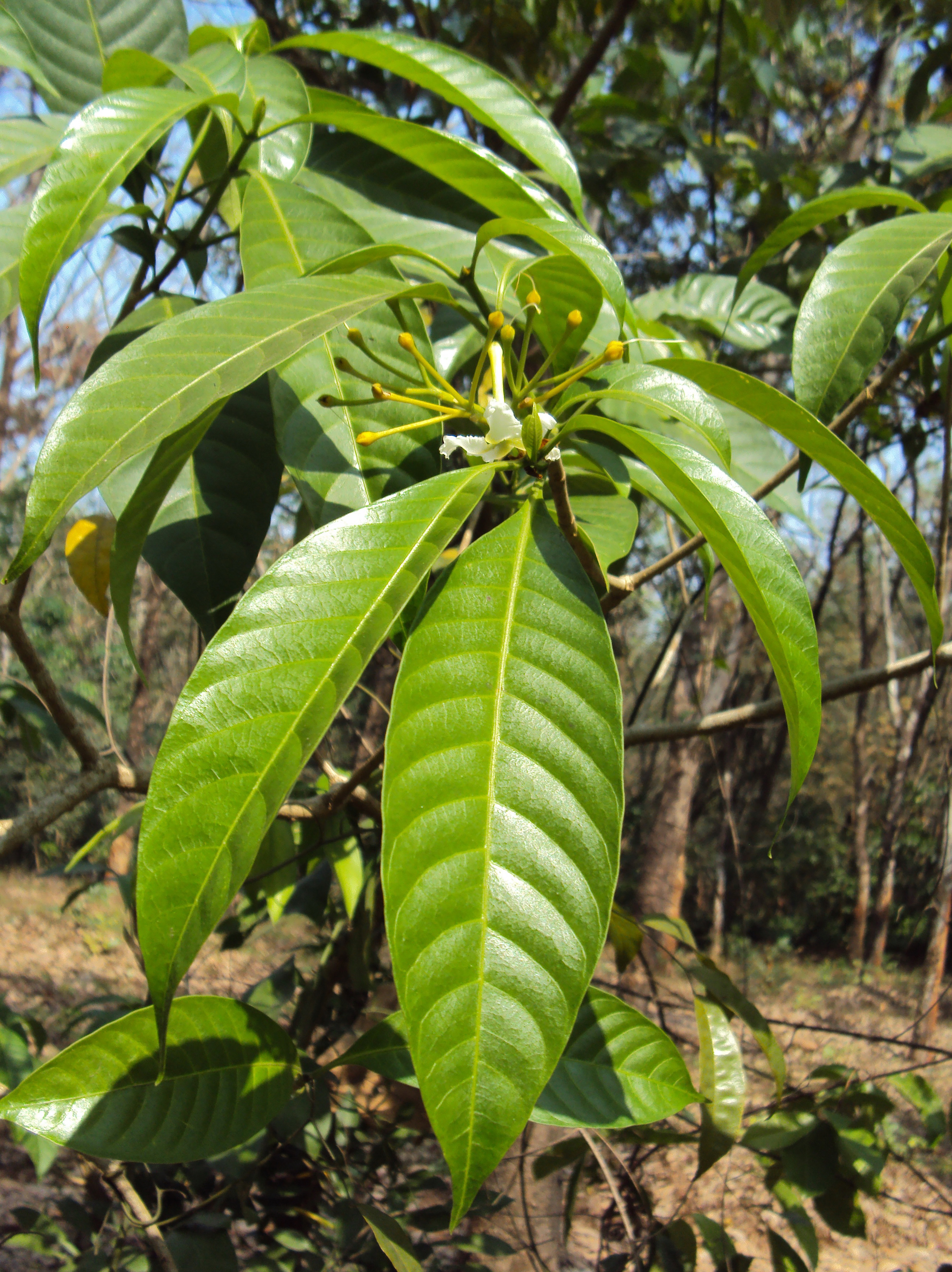
- Leaves and flowers

Scientific classification
- Kingdom: Plantae
- Clade: Tracheophytes
- Clade: Angiosperms
- Clade: Eudicots
- Clade: Asterids
- Order: Gentianales
- Family: Apocynaceae
- Genus: Tabernaemontana
- Species: T. alternifolia

Binomial name
- Tabernaemontana alternifolia L.

Synonyms
- Ervatamia alternifolia (L.) S.M.Almeida; Ervatamia heyneana (Wall.) T.Cooke; Pagiantha crispa (Roxb.) Markgr.; Pagiantha heyneana (Wall.) Markgr.; Tabernaemontana crispa Roxb.; Tabernaemontana heyneana Wall.; Tabernaemontana intercedens Van Heurck & Müll.Arg.; Tabernaemontana oblonga Wall.

= Tabernaemontana alternifolia =

Species of plant

Tabernaemontana alternifolia is a species of plant in the family Apocynaceae. It is endemic to India.

== Taxonomy ==
The name Tabernaemontana heyneana Wall. has often been used for this species, and a proposal was made to conserve that name so that it would be used instead of T. alternifolia. Arguments made for conservation were that the type of the species was not a specimen but an illustration, and that the plant has opposite leaves, not alternate leaves as alternifolia implies. However, the proposal was rejected, and the correct name of this species is the original name, T. alternifolia.

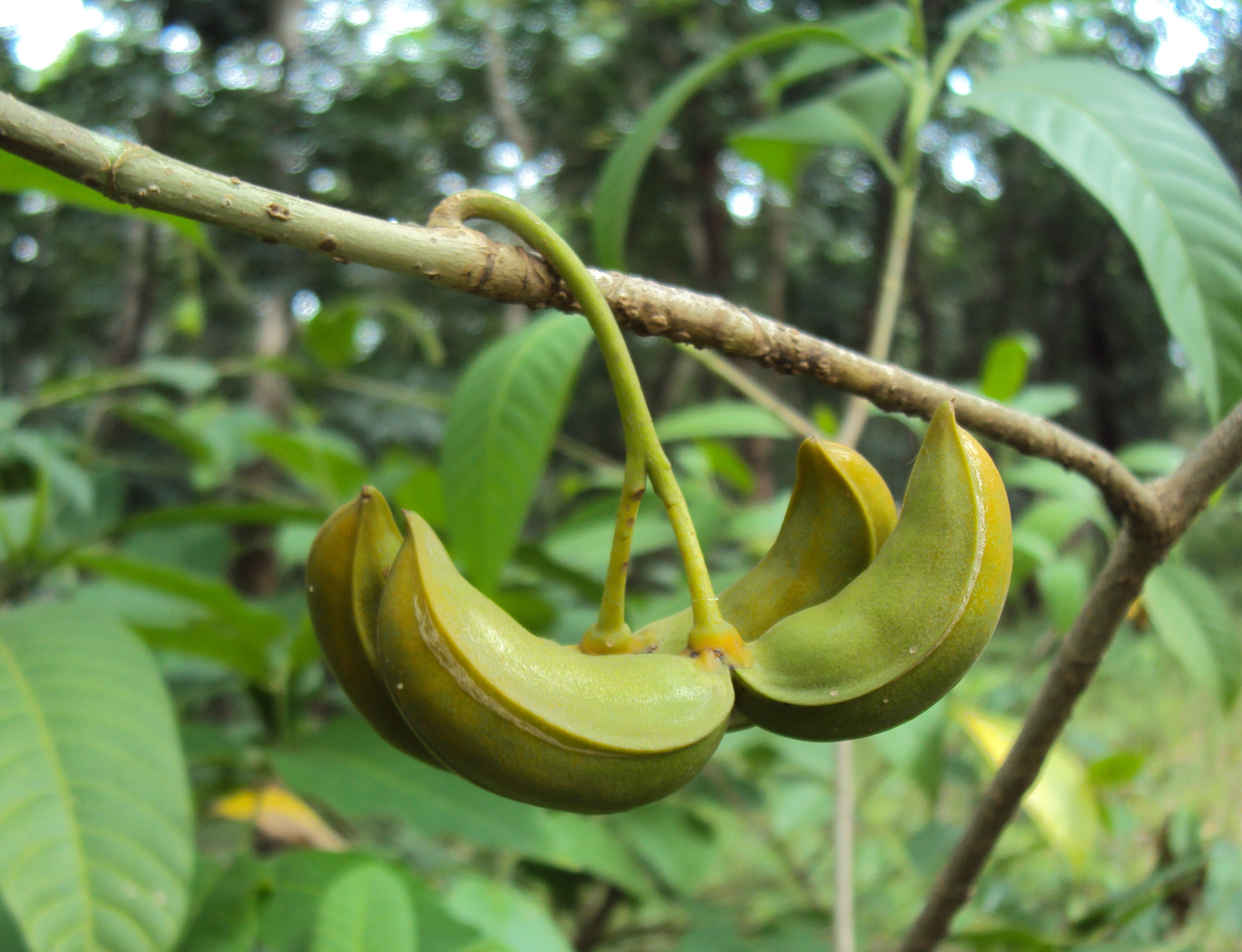
Unripe fruit

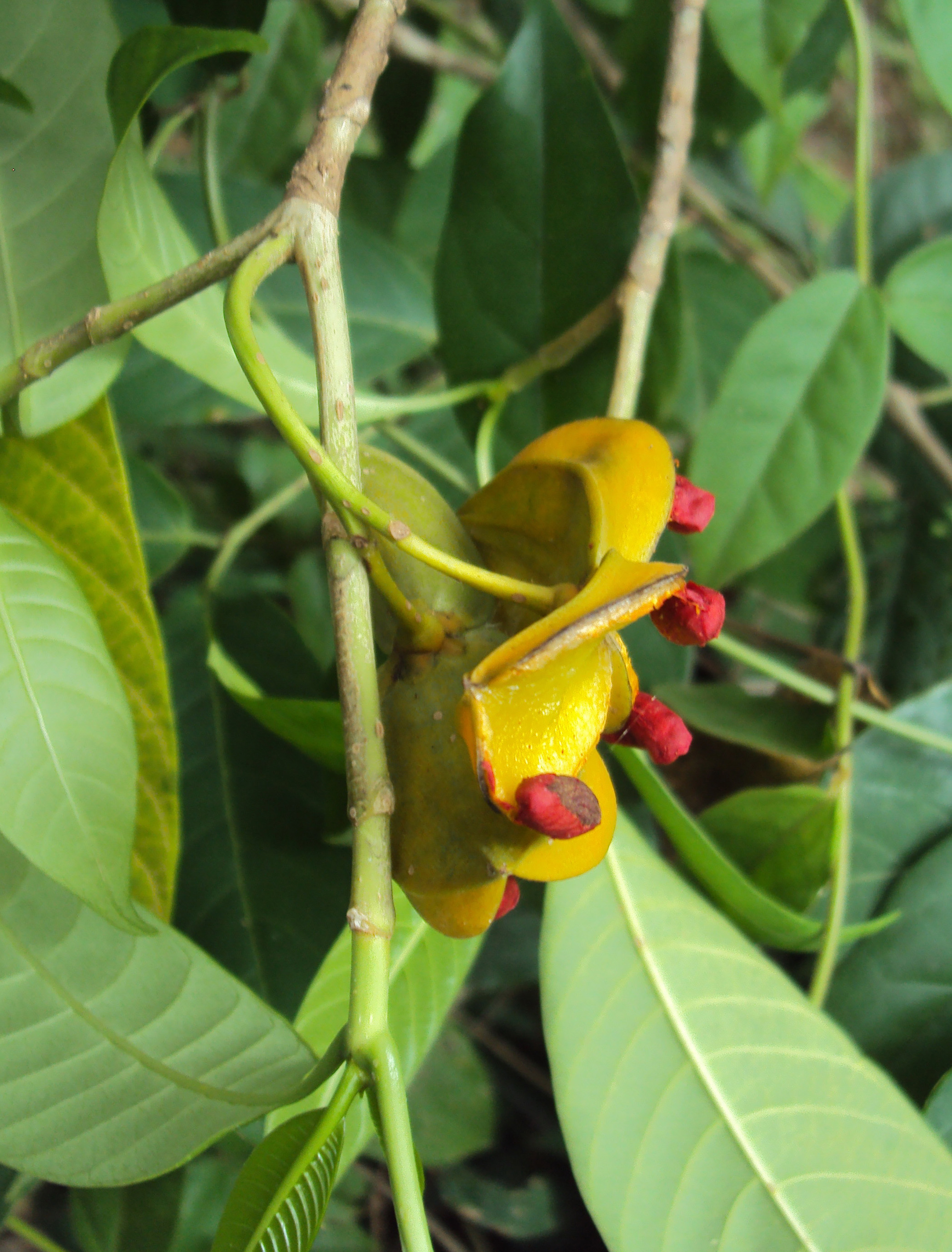
Ripe fruit
