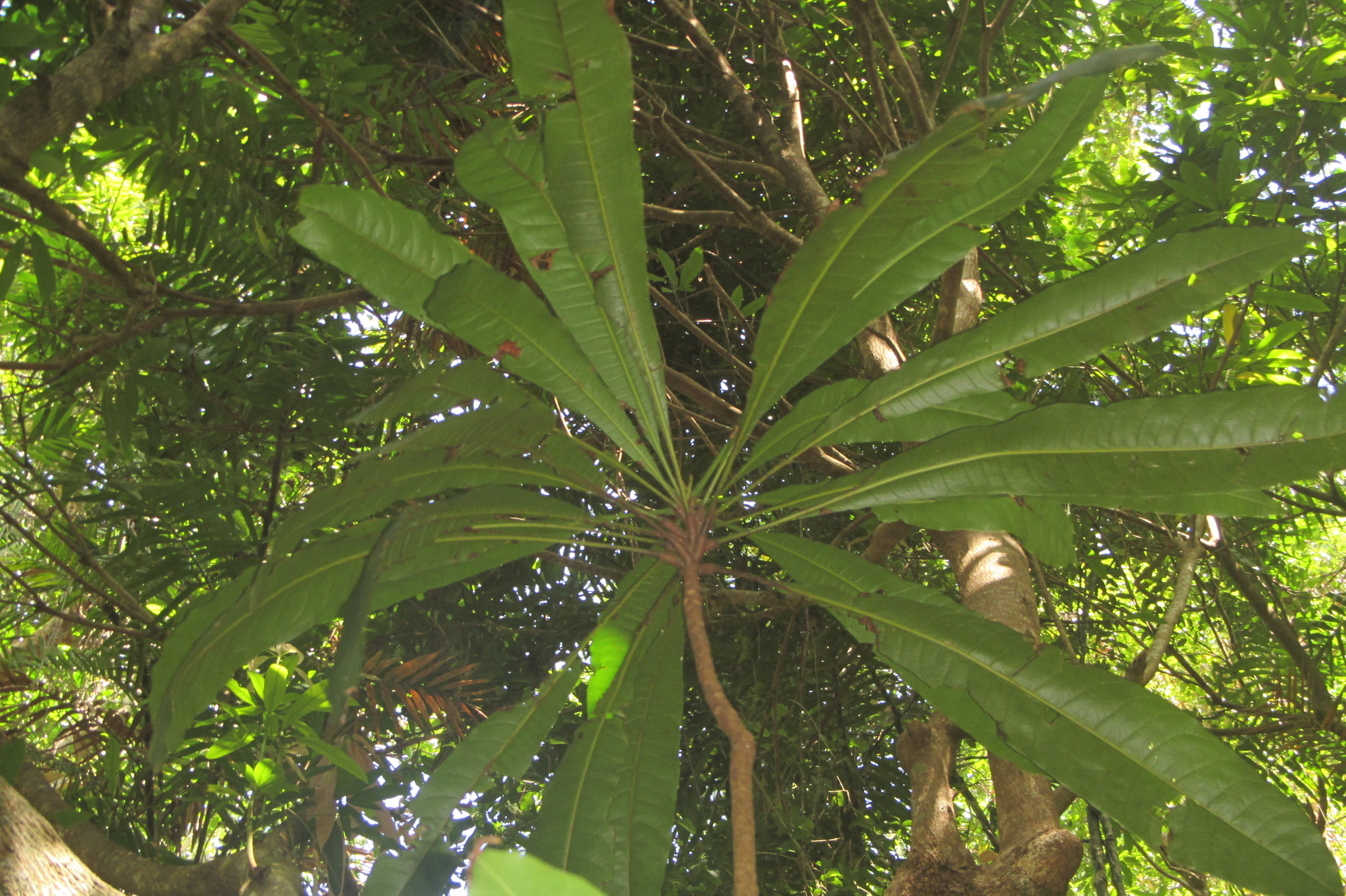
- On High Island, south of Cairns

Scientific classification
- Kingdom: Animalia
- Phylum: Mollusca
- Class: Gastropoda
- Subclass: Vetigastropoda
- Order: Lepetellida
- Family: Fissurellidae
- Genus: Buchanania
- Species: B. mangoides

Binomial name
- Buchanania mangoides F.Muell.

= Buchanania mangoides =

Plum tree

Species of flowering plant

Buchanania mangoides, commonly known as plum tree, is a plant in the mango and cashew family Anacardiaceae native to Queensland, Australia. It was first described in 1869.

== Description ==
Buchanania mangoides is a small tree growing up to 13 m (43 ft) tall, with a trunk less than 30 cm (12 in) diameter. The leaves are similar to those of the mango - they are oblong to obovate and may reach 40 cm (16 in) in length and 7 cm (2.8 in) wide, with up to 25 pairs of lateral veins on either side of the midrib. The leaf blade tapers gradually into the petiole (leaf stalk), making it difficult to determine where one ends and the other begins.

The inflorescences are panicles about 17 cm (6.7 in) long produced from the leaf axils, flowers are about 4 mm (0.16 in) wide.

The fruit is a red to black drupe about 7 mm (0.28 in) diameter, containing a single seed.

=== Phenology ===
Flowering has been observed in September and fruit appear between September and December.

== Taxonomy ==
This species was first described in 1869 by Ferdinand von Mueller in his massive work Fragmenta phytographiæ Australiæ, based on material collected by John Dallachy from the Family Islands group, about 120 km (75 mi) south of Cairns in a direct line.

=== Etymology ===
The species epithet mangoides is a reference to the similarity of the foliage to that of the common mango.

== Distribution and habitat ==
This species is found on a number of inshore islands north and south of Cairns, from Snapper Island near the mouth of the Daintree River, south to Orpheus Island, about 80 km (50 mi) northwest of Townsville. It also occurs rarely on the mainland adjacent to some of the islands. The altitudinal range is close to sea level.

== Conservation ==
This species is listed by the Queensland Government's Department of Environment, Science and Innovation as least concern. As of 25 March 2024, it has not been assessed by the International Union for Conservation of Nature (IUCN).
