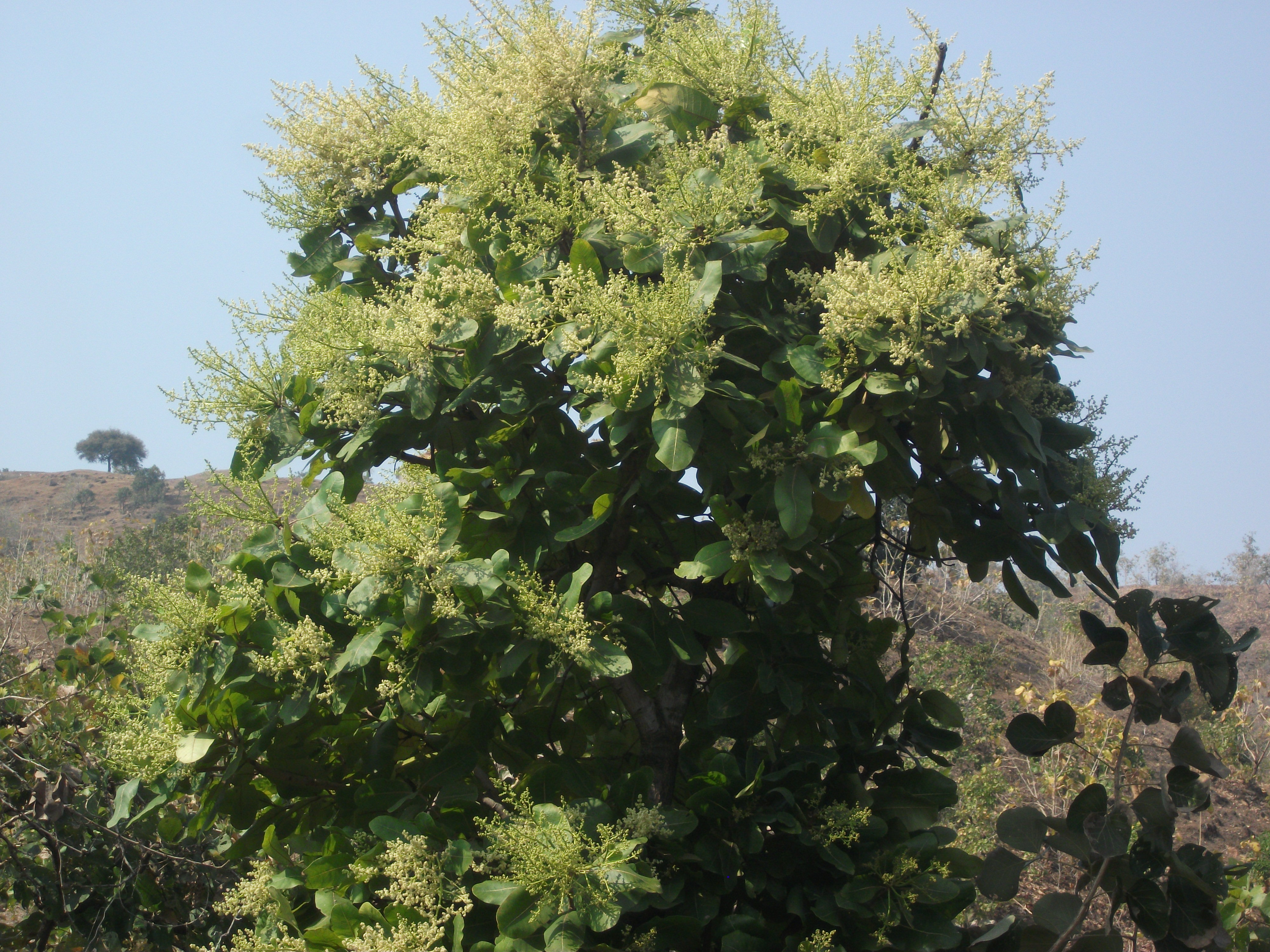
- Flowering charoli tree in Maharashtra, India

Scientific classification
- Kingdom: Plantae
- Clade: Tracheophytes
- Clade: Angiosperms
- Clade: Eudicots
- Clade: Rosids
- Order: Sapindales
- Family: Anacardiaceae
- Genus: Buchanania
- Species: B. lanzan

Binomial name
- Buchanania lanzan Spreng.

Synonyms
- Buchanania lanzan var. palodensis E.S.S.Kumar, Shareef & Raj Vikr.; Buchanania latifolia Roxb.; Lanzana solitaria Stokes; Lundia mangiferoides Puerari ex DC., pro syn.; Mangifera silvestris Roxb.; Spondias elliptica Rottb.

= Buchanania lanzan =

Species of flowering plant

Buchanania lanzan, commonly known as charoli nut, almondette, Cuddapah almond, calumpong, Hamilton mombin, is a deciduous tree in the family Anacardiaceae. The charoli tree is native to the Indian subcontinent, South Central China, and much of Southeast Asia.

The charoli tree produces fruit that is edible to humans. The seeds are used as a cooking spice, especially in India. Charoli seeds are also used in the Ayurveda, Unani, and Siddha systems of medicine.

Some sources misapply the name Buchanania cochinchinensis to this species.

== Description ==
The tree grows to about 20 m (66 ft). Young branches are covered with dense, matted, woolly hairs. The leaves are 10 cm–20 cm × 6 cm–9 cm (3.9 in–7.9 in × 2.4 in–3.5 in), broadly oblong with emarginate (slightly indented at the tip) apices and rounded bases. The flowers are white and 0.3–0.4 cm (0.12–0.16 in) in diameter. The fruit are drupes, 0.4–1 cm (0.16–0.39 in) in diameter and subglobose (not quite spherical) in shape. When ripe, they are stone hard and reddish-purple in color. Flowering occurs March–April, and the fruit is generally harvested in the months of April to June.

== Taxonomy ==
Genus Buchanania is named for Francis Buchanan (1762–1829), a Scottish botanist, explorer, naturalist, and surgeon in the British East India Company. B. lanzan is one of 26 currently accepted species in genus Buchanania. The species was first described in 1801 by Kurt Polycarp Joachim Sprengel. Some authorities treat B. lanzan as a synonym of B. cochinchinensis. However, B. cochinchinensis is a synonym of Glycosmis cochinchinensis.

== Distribution and habitat ==
The charoli tree is native to Bangladesh, Cambodia, China (south-central and Hainan), India, Laos, Myanmar, Nepal, Thailand, Vietnam, and the Western Himalayas. It grows in the wet tropical biome.

== Uses ==
=== Food and cooking ===
Though sometimes referred to as the "chironji nut" or "charoli nut", the fruit is actually a type of drupe rather than a true botanical nut. After the hard shell is cracked, the stubby seed within is similar in texture to a pine nut. The charoli seed is around 0.6 cm (0.24 in) in length, with a flavor resembling an almond or a pistachio. The seeds are used as a cooking spice, especially in Indian cuisine. Though they can be eaten raw, they are often toasted or roasted before use, as this intensifies the flavor of any nut or seed. They are commonly used in Indian sweets, or ground into powders for thickening and flavoring savory sauces, batters and kormas.

=== Traditional medicine ===
Charoli seeds are used in the Ayurveda, Unani, and Siddha systems of medicine. A decoction can be prepared from the bark of the stem or the leaves, to be used as a treatment for indigestion, mumps, impotence, spermatorrhea, heavy menstrual bleeding, diarrhea, and snakebite. This can also be used as an expectorant, aphrodisiac, or a laxative. The leaves can be crushed and applied to burns and wounds.

== Cultivation ==
The species is not commercially cultivated in India. The fruit is collected by local people from the forests and sold directly to the local markets. With a potential annual production of 5000 metric tonnes, Chhattisgarh is the highest-producing state in India for charoli fruit. Leafhoppers, mealybugs, and bark-eating caterpillars (Indarbela spp.) are important pests of B. cochinchinensis, while gummosis and powdery mildew represent important pathogens.

== Significance in Buddhism ==
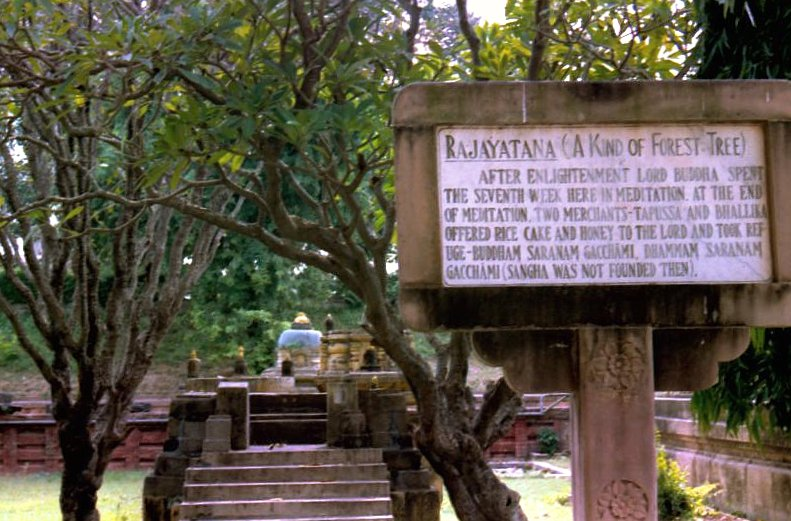
Rajayatana trees (B. cochinchinensis) at the Mahabodhi Temple complex in Bodh Gaya, Bihar, India

Circa 588 BCE, the 35-year-old Siddhartha Gautama stayed for seven weeks (7x7 days = 49 days = 1 sattasattāha) at Uruvela (modern Bodh Gaya), which is located in the present-day Indian state of Bihar. According to the Great Chronicle of Buddhas, he spent one week at each of seven successive locations there. During these seven weeks, he did not eat or drink, wash or excrete, or lie down. The specific locations were:

- Week 1: the Week on the Aparājita Throne (Pallanka Sattāha). After meditating under the Bodhi Tree for seven days and nights, he attained enlightenment, becoming the spiritual teacher known as the Buddha and the founder of Buddhism.
- Week 2: the Week of the Gaze (Animisa Sattāha)
- Week 3: the Week on the Walk (Cankama Sattāha)
- Week 4: the Week at the Golden House (Ratanāghara Sattāha)
- Week 5: the Week at the Ajapāla Banyan Tree
- Week 6: the Week at Mucalinda Lake (Mucalinda Sattāha)
- Week 7: the Week at the Rājāyatana Tree (Rājāyatana Sattāha)

The seventh week was passed while sitting under a rājāyatana (B. cochinchinensis) tree, where the Buddha enjoyed the bliss of his newly attained buddhahood. Upon the completion of this sattasattāha, several important "firsts" in Buddhism took place at the rājāyatana tree at Bodh Gaya, including:

- the first words of dharma to be uttered by the Buddha
- the first lay disciples (two passing merchants from Pokkharavatī named Tapussa and Bhallika) to take refuge in the teachings of the Buddha
- the first food offering to the Buddha (rice cake and honey) after his enlightenment
- the first Buddhist monk's bowl
- the first relics of the Buddha to be distributed after his attainment of buddhahood

According to Burmese folklore, Tapussa and Bhallika (the two passing merchants who became the Buddha's first lay disciples) later returned to their home in Okkalapa (Lower Burma), where they built a cetiya on Singuttara Hill (the Shwedagon Pagoda), where they enshrined the hair relics given to them by the Buddha.

== Gallery ==
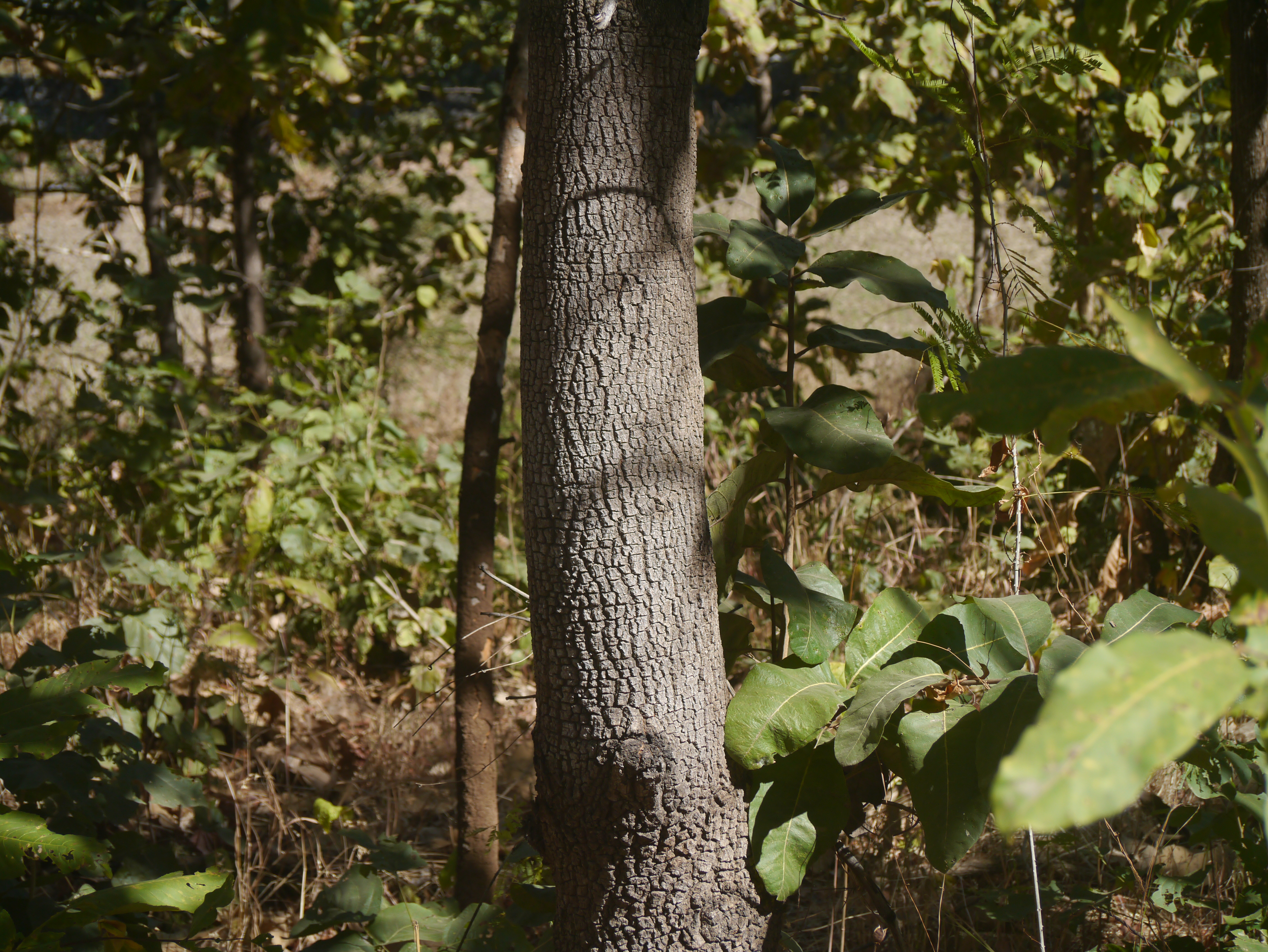
Trunk

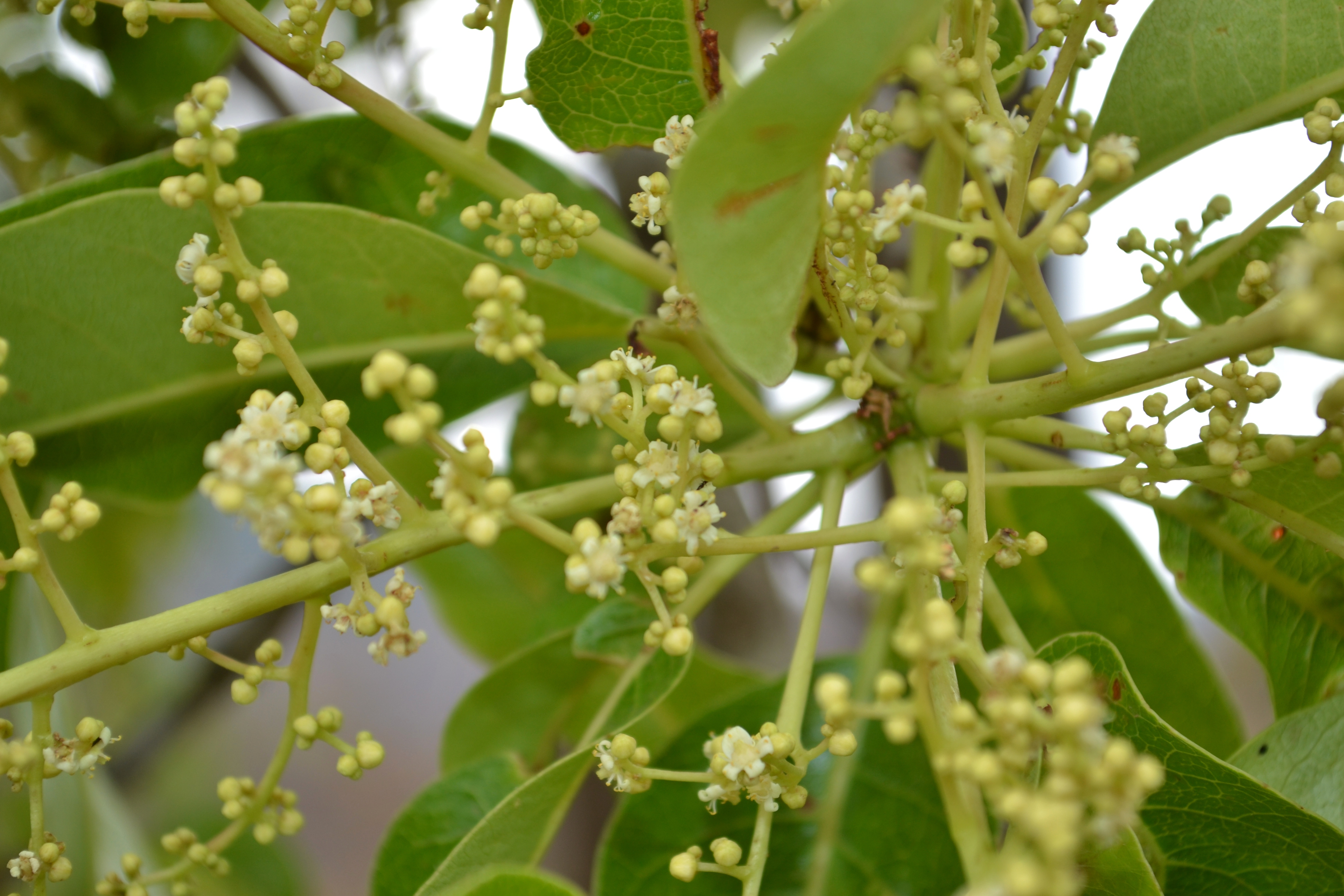
Flowers and flower buds

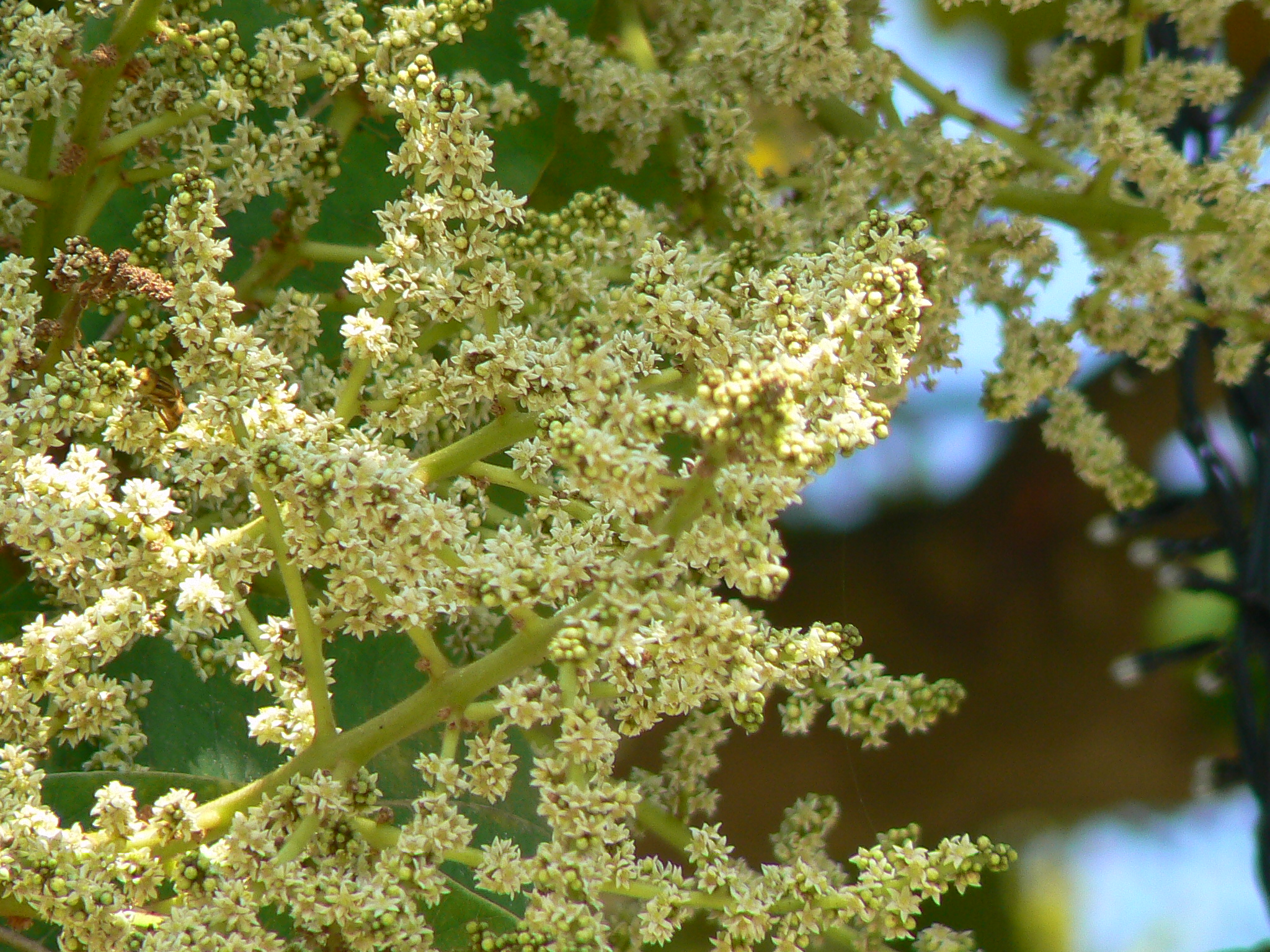
Flowers

Detail of flowers

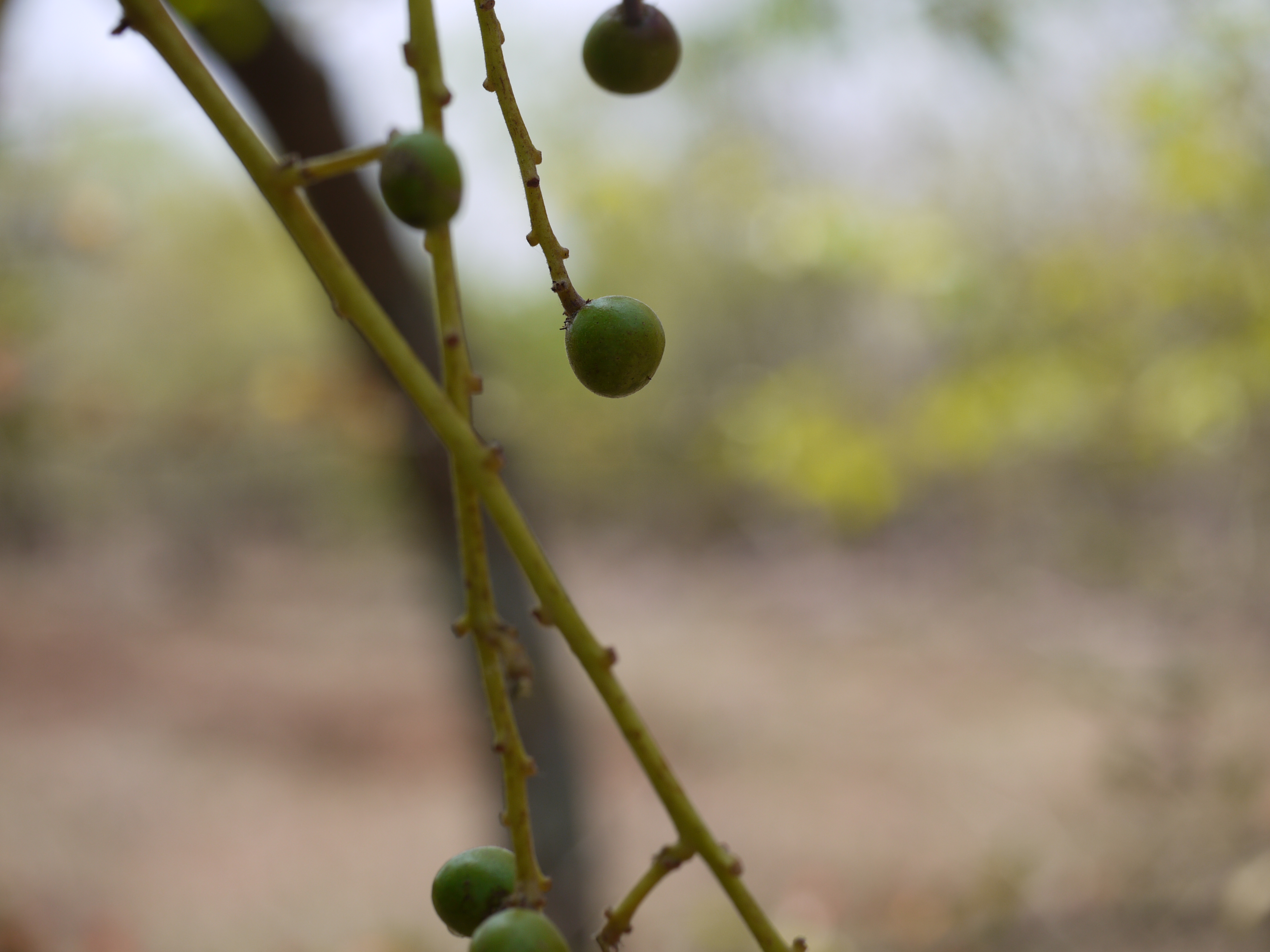
Charoli fruit

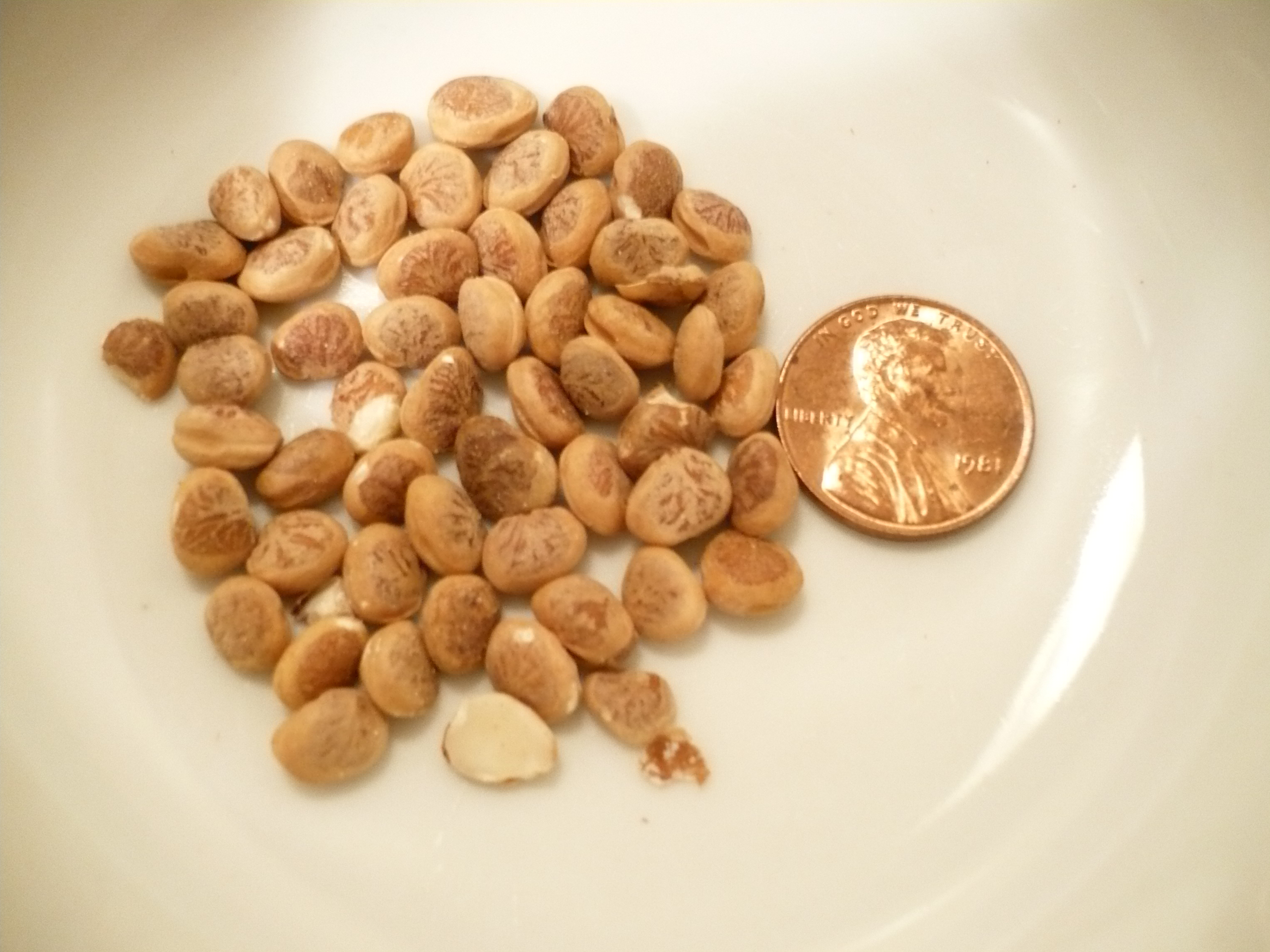
Charoli seeds

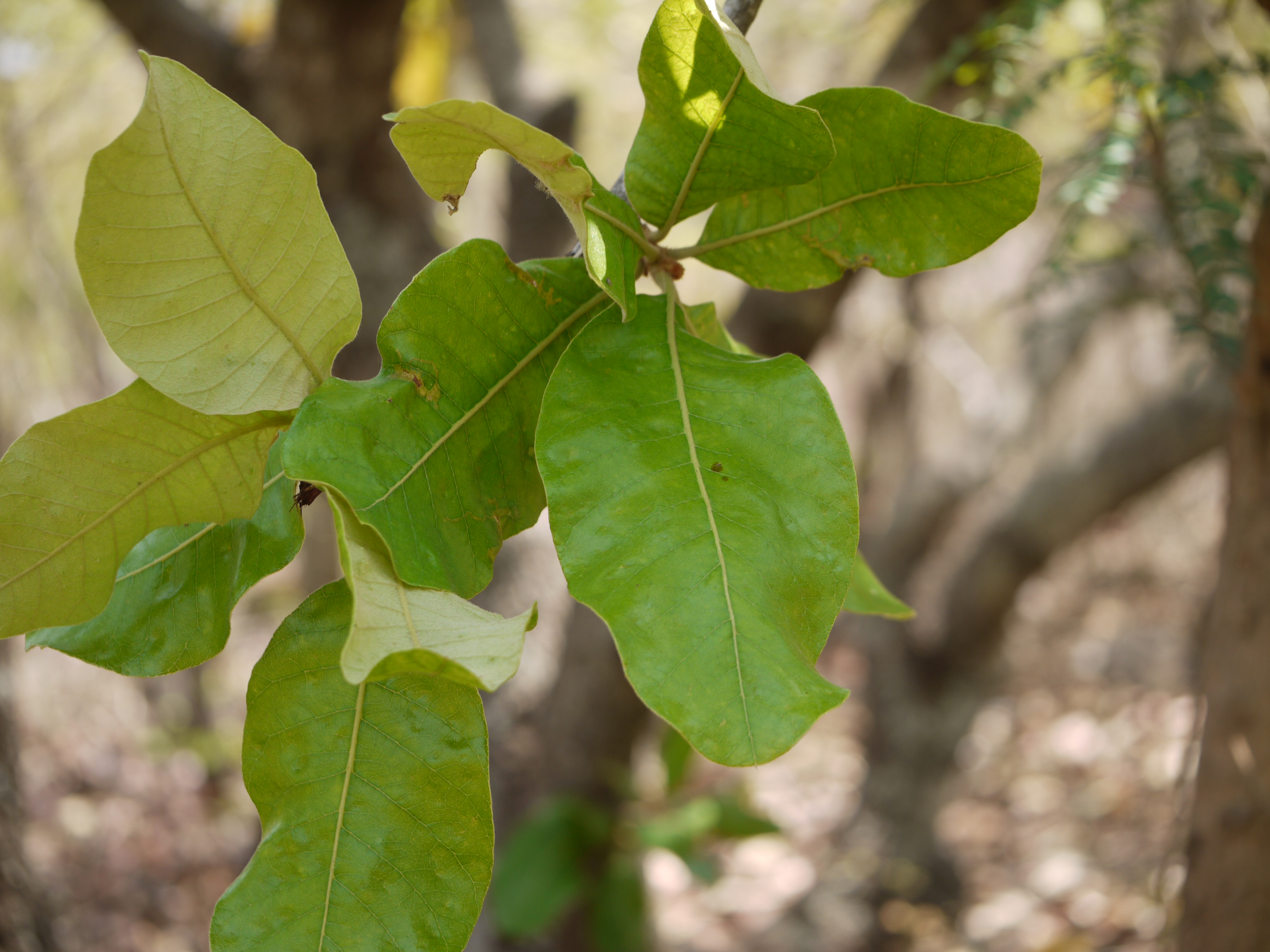
Leaves

== See also ==
- List of culinary herbs and spices
- List of Indian spices
- Mudaima

== Bibliography ==
- Almeida, Marselin Rusario (1996). "Buchanania cochinchinensis (Lour.)". Flora of Maharashtra. 1.
- Barua, Sukomal (2003). "Buddha Purnima". In Islam, Sirajul; Jamal, Ahmed A. (eds.). Banglapedia: National Encyclopedia of Bangladesh. Vol. 3 (2nd ed.). Nimtali, Dhaka, Bangladesh: Asiatic Society of Bangladesh. ISBN 978-9843205766. Archived from the original on 8 May 2016.
- Beddome, R.H. (1869). "XXXIII: Anacardiaceae". The Flora Sylvatica for southern India. Vol. 1. Madras: Gantz Brothers.
- Bopearachchi, Osmund (2016). Seven Weeks after the Buddha's Enlightenment: Contradictions in Text, Confusions in Art. New Delhi: Manohar Publishers & Distributors. ISBN 978-9350981375. Archived from the original on 28 January 2023.
- Bowen, Dana (28 April 2004). "Temptation; Charoli Nuts Flavor the Dishes, and Memories, of Indian Chefs". The New York Times. Archived from the original on 10 October 2022.
- Dhammadharo, Ajahn Lee (1998). "Visakha Puja". Access to Insight. Translated by Bhikkhu, Thanissaro. Barre, Massachusetts: Barre Center for Buddhist Studies. Archived from the original on 4 March 2012.
- Goldberg, Kory; Decary, Michele (2013). Along the Path: The Meditator's Companion to Pilgrimage in the Buddha's India and Nepal (2nd ed.). Onalaska, Washington: Pariyatti Press. ISBN 978-1938754586. Archived from the original on 27 January 2023.
- Howes, Frank Norman (1948). "Miscellaneous and Little-known Nuts". Nuts: Their Production and Everyday Uses. London: Faber and Faber. Archived from the original on 27 January 2023.
- India Biodiversity Portal (2023). "Buchanania cochinchinensis (Lour.) Almeida". India Biodiversity Portal. Archived from the original on 11 May 2021.
- Malakar, Ayushman; Sahoo, Hareram; Kumar, Aditya (2022). "Commercial cultivation procedure of Chironji (Buchanania cochinchinensis (Lour.) M.R. Almedia): A money spinning native tree species of India". International Journal of Humanities, Engineering, Science and Management. 3 (1). doi:10.13140/RG.2.2.25073.76646/1. ISSN 2582-8169.
- Plants for a Future (2023). "Buchanania lanzan - Spreng". Plants For A Future (PFAF). Dawlish, England: Plants for a Future. Archived from the original on 14 December 2022.
- Quattrocchi, Umberto (2012). "Buchanania Sprengel Anacardiaceae". CRC World Dictionary of Medicinal and Poisonous Plants: Common Names, Scientific Names, Eponyms, Synonyms, and Etymology. New York: Taylor & Francis Group. ISBN 978-1482250640. Archived from the original on 12 March 2023.
- Sayadaw, Mingun, ed. (2008). "The Buddha's stay at the Seven Places". The Great Chronicle of Buddhas (PDF). Vol. 2 (Singapore ed.). Archived (PDF) from the original on 13 April 2022.
- Singh, N.P.; Karthikeyan, S., eds. (2000). "Buchanania Spreng.". Flora of Maharashtra State (PDF). Flora of India. Vol. 1 (1st ed.). Kolkata: Botanical Survey of India. Archived (PDF) from the original on 26 January 2023.
- Strong, John S. (2004). Relics of the Buddha. Princeton, New Jersey: Princeton University Press. ISBN 978-0691117645. Archived from the original on 27 January 2023.
- Vicittasarabhivamsa, Bhaddanta, ed. (2006). "The Buddha's stay at the Seven Places". The Great Chronicle of Buddhas (PDF). Vol. 2, Part 1. Yangon, Myanmar: Ti=Ni Publishing Center. Archived (PDF) from the original on 12 March 2023.
