= Glycosmis cochinchinensis =

Conservation status
- Least Concern (IUCN 3.1)

Scientific classification
- Kingdom: Plantae
- Clade: Tracheophytes
- Clade: Angiosperms
- Clade: Eudicots
- Clade: Rosids
- Order: Sapindales
- Family: Rutaceae
- Genus: Glycosmis
- Species: G. cochinchinensis

Binomial name
- Glycosmis cochinchinensis (Lour.) Pierre ex Engl.

Synonyms
- Homotypic Synonyms: Buchanania cochinchinensis (Lour.) M.R.Almeida; Loureira cochinchinensis (Lour.) Meisn.; Toluifera cochinchinensis Lour.; Heterotypic Synonyms: Glycosmis cochinchinensis var. contracta Craib; Glycosmis greenei var. virgata Tanaka; Glycosmis parkeri V.Naray.; Glycosmis touranensis Guillaumin

Species of flowering plant

Glycosmis cochinchinensis is a species of tree in the family Rutaceae. It is native to Cambodia, South-Central and Southeast China, Hainan, Laos, Myanmar, Thailand, and Vietnam. It was first described by João de Loureiro in 1790 as Toluifera cochinchinensis. Adolf Engler transferred it to the genus Glycosmis in 1896. The combination Buchanania cochinchinensis was published in 1996, and has been misapplied by some sources to refer to Buchanania lanzan.

== Bibliography ==
- de Loureiro, João (1790). "Genus IV: Toluifera". Flora Cochinchinensis (in Latin). 1. Archived from the original on 26 January 2023.
