= Anbangbang Billabong =

Coordinates: 12°51′52″S 132°47′49″E

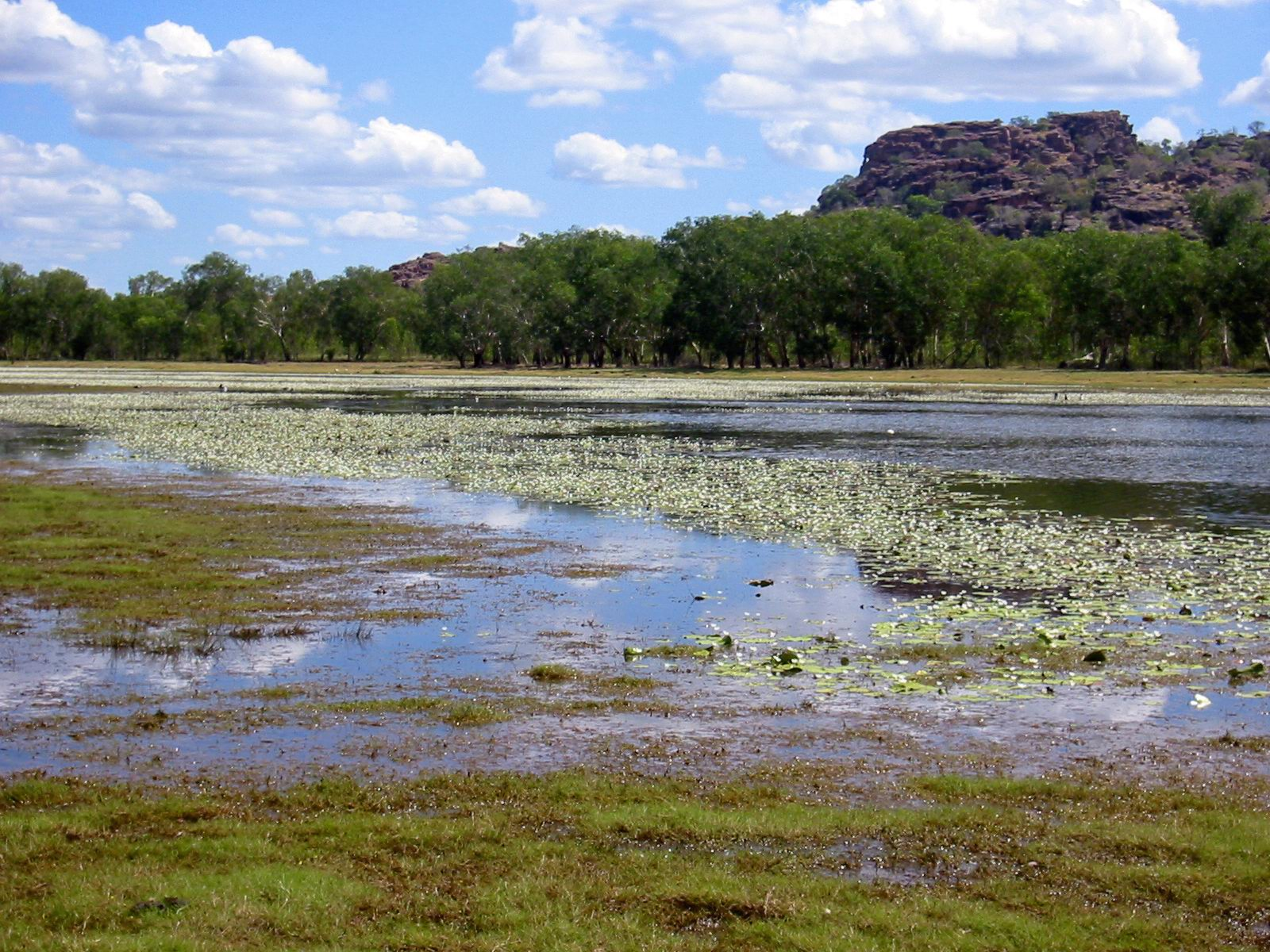
Anbangbang Billabong, Kakadu National Park, Australia, at the beginning of the dry season.

Anbangbang Billabong lies in the shadow of Burrunggui (Nourlangie Rock) within Kakadu National Park and is a good place to view a wide range of wildlife. Large numbers of waterfowl and wading birds inhabit the billabong and many wallabies can be found grazing around the water's edge. There is a walking trail around the circumference of Anbangbang Billabong with many picnic areas.

== Geography ==
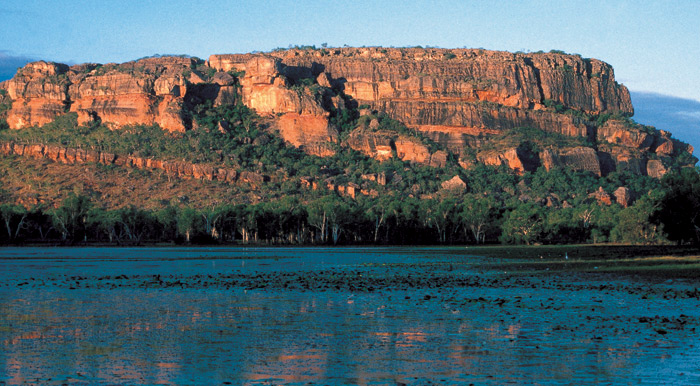
Burrunggui (Nourlangie Rock), as seen from Anbangbang Billabong towards the end of the wet season.

The Anbangbang Billabong is overlooked by the Nawurlandja and Burrunggui plateaux. In the wet season, it is fed by runoff from these, as well as by overflow from Nourlangie Creek; however during the dry season it is cut off.

=== Fauna ===
Like much of Kakadu, Anbangbang Billabong is home to a particularly large variety of bird life. The fluctuating water levels draw waterfowl such as magpie geese, pelicans, darters, spoonbills and brolga. Other fauna known to frequent the billabong include wallabies, file snakes, long-necked turtles, dingoes and goannas.

Mangroves lining the billabong support populations of freshwater mussel. Adjacent woodlands play host to a different ecosystem again. The nearby Nawurlandja plateau supports local populations of short-eared rock-wallaby and chestnut-quilled rock pigeon, among other species.

=== Flora ===
The swelling billabong promotes seasonal growth of sedges, grasses, water lilies, and freshwater mangrove line the water's edge. Swamp areas support many types of paperbark, in particular the weeping paperbark, silver-leaved paperbark and broad-leaved paperbark.

The woodlands surrounding the billabong are a lush habitat with an abundance of plant species. Darwin woollybutt and Darwin stringybark dominate, with large populations of fan palms, the kapok Cochlospermum fraseri, red apples, wattle and Pandanus.

=== Climate ===
Like much of Kakadu, the Anbangbang Billabong region's climate is monsoonal. The region's Aboriginal owners recognise six seasons, however these can be reduced to vastly differing dry and wet seasons where the billabong is respectively depleted and replenished.

== Tourism ==
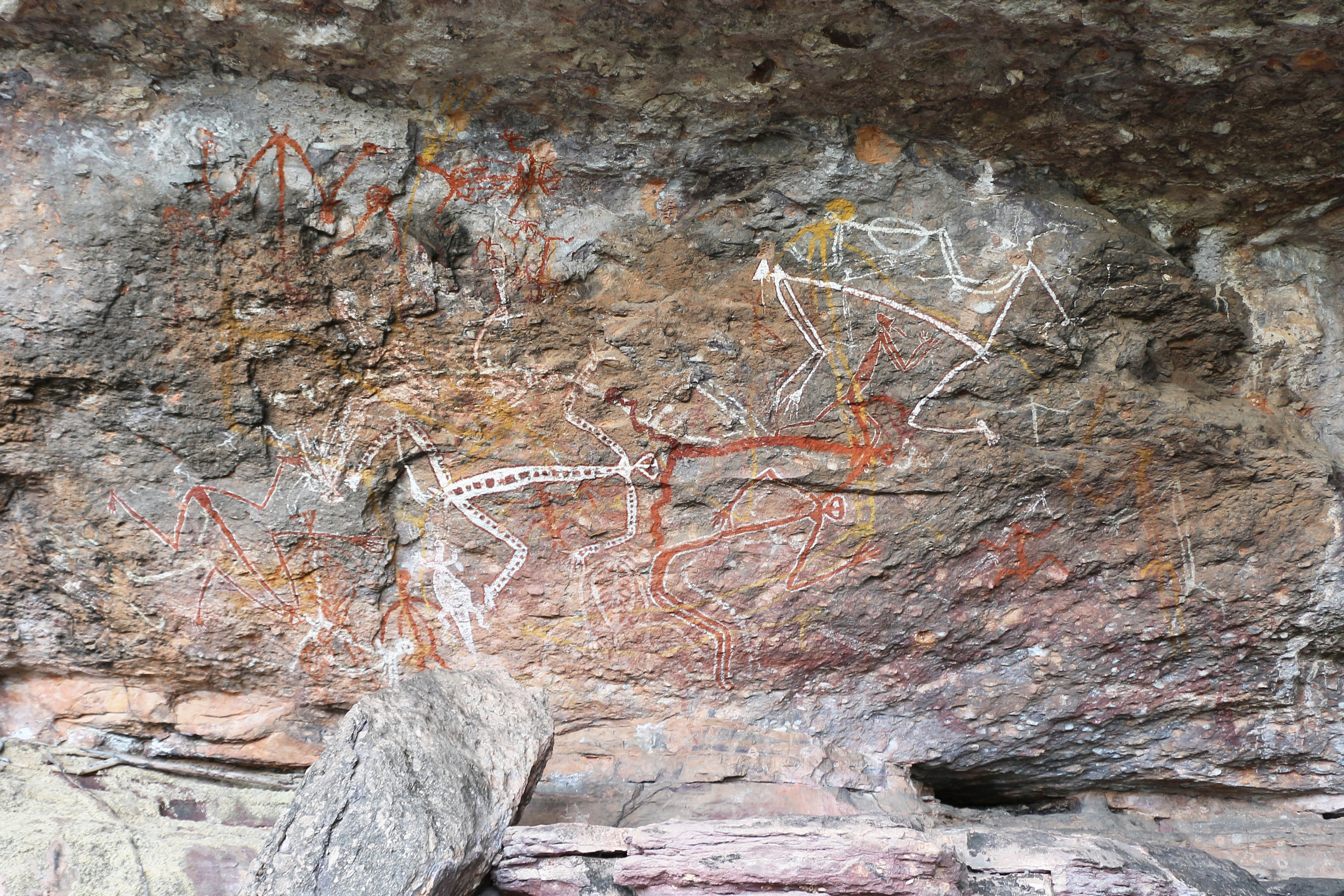
Aboriginal rock painting of Mimi spirits in the Anbangbang gallery at Burrunggui (Nourlangie Rock).

Anbangbang Billabong has a marked, 2.5 km (1.6 mi) circular walk, popular with tourists to Kakadu National Park, but accessible only during the dry season. It is a hotspot for bird watching during the late dry and early wet seasons due to the abundance of birdlife. The nearby Nourlangie plateau (Burrunggui) and Anbangbang shelter are of particular interest for their Aboriginal rock art and 20,000-year human history.

== Aboriginal belief and toponomy ==
A creation story of the people of the area tells that the Anbangbang Billabong landscape was formed by a pair of short-eared rock-wallabies, known in a local language as badbong, who are responsible for cutting crevices in the rock and parting the trees for the billabong. This origin tale is commemorated in an Aboriginal name for nearby Nourlangie Rock, Badbong Bawardedjobgeng, more often known as Burrunggui from the Kundjeyhmi language name.

The meaning of the name Anbangbang is not known.

== See also ==
- Plants Kakadu National Park
- Kakadu plum
- Nourlangie Rock
- Bininj
