= Mador =

Mador may refer to:

- Sir Mador de la Porte, a Knight of the Round Table
- Mador (Camp Ramah), training camp for Jewish summer camps in US, Canada and Israel
- Terminalia ferdinandiana, commonly known as mador
