= Nayombolmi =

Australian Aboriginal artist (c. 1895–1967)

- Nayombolmi in 1966
- Born: 1895; Badmardi Country, Australia
- Died: August 14, 1967 (aged 71–72); Mudginberri Station
- Known for: rock art
- Father: Nanggwirid

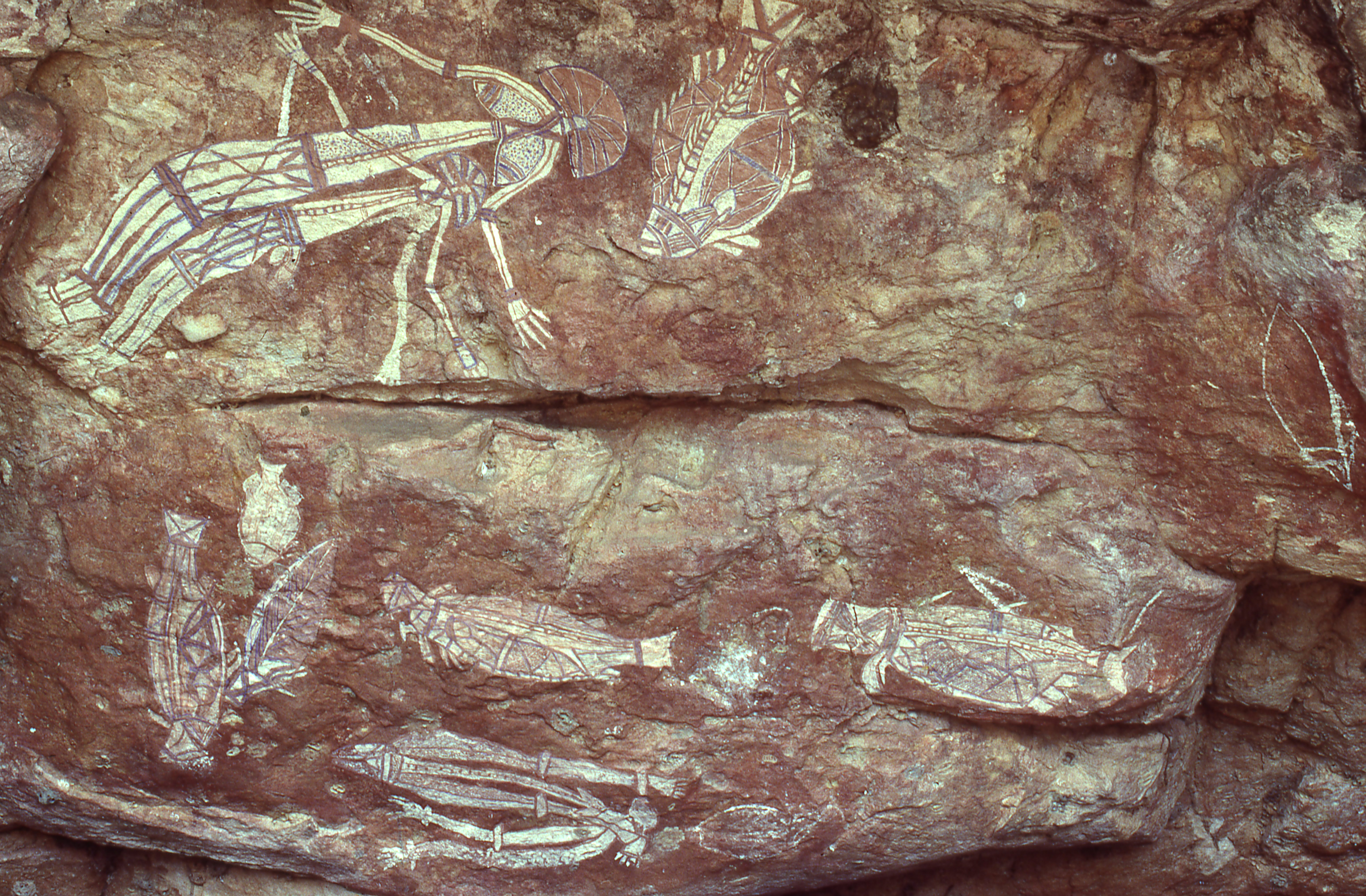
Blue paintings painted by Nayombolmi in the 1950s at Kakadu

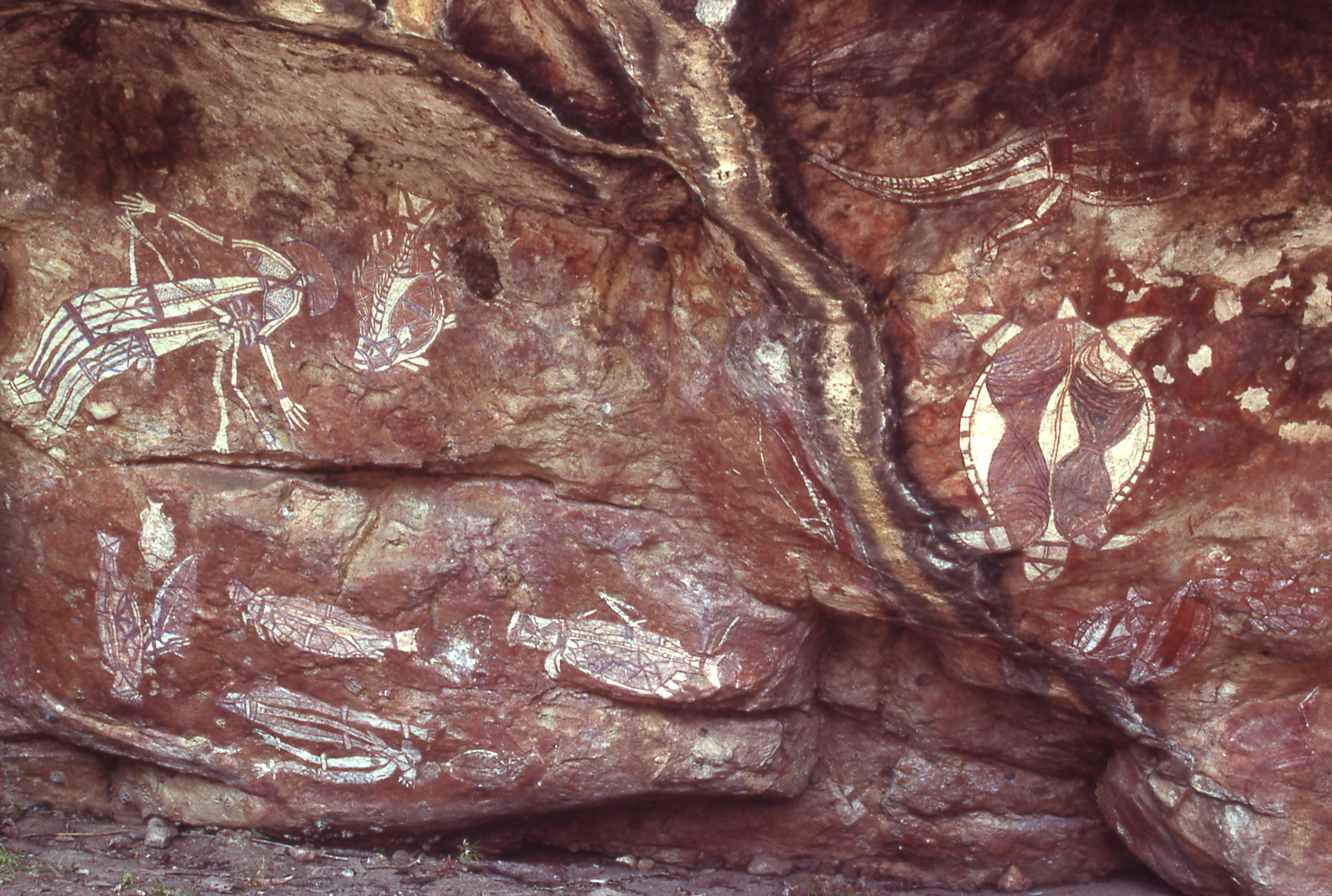
Blue paintings painted by Nayombolmi in the 1950s at Kakadu

Nayombolmi or Najombolmi, who was also known as Barramundi Charlie (c. 1895 – 14 August 1967) was a Badmardi (Bininj) and Jawoyn man born at Balawurru, in the Adelaide River region, of the Northern Territory of Australia. This area is now the Kakadu National Park.

Nayombolmi was a rock artist and bark painter and he is considered to be "the most prolific known rock artist in the world".

== Biography ==
Nayombolmi's parents were Nanggwirid, a Badmardi man, and his mother was a Jawoyn woman whose name is not recorded. He spent his early years living with his family on Badmardi Country and learned to speak many languages and dialects as well as the required bush skills and cultural knowledge. Nayombolmi became a skilled hunter and often brought down water buffalo with a spear and it was for his fishing skills that he became known as 'Barramundi Charlie'.

In the 1920s and 1930s, as colonisation in the area increased, Nayombolmi began working seasonally for buffalo hunters, such as Tom Cole, and he is also known to have worked as a dingo scalper (dogger), crocodile hunter and gold miner. Between 1929 and 1930 he met with Francis Birtles when he was gold prospecting in the area and, during this period, Nayombolmi decorated Birtles Bean Car with paintings that resembled rock art motifs. These included depictions of an emu, a freshwater crocodile, two turtles, a saratoga (fish), a hand-and-arm stencil and 14 human-like figures. Nayombolmi was not identified as the artist at the time but was later confirmed in an oral history interview with his brother George Namingum. It is likely that during this period Nayombolmi and his family worked for Birtles and his gold mine known as Imarlkba (which was on important ceremonial grounds for the Badmardi clan), which became part of the Arnhem Land Gold Development Company, which Birtles later sold at great profit. Nayombolmi and his people were they were paid in only food, tobacco and alcohol rather than money.

It is not recorded what happened to Nayombolmi during World War II but as of the 1950s he was working as a stockman at Barramundie Station and at a timber camp at Manlarr (Kunwinjku) which were both nearby to Jabiru. It was here that art collectors and art dealers began to visit the area and his bark paintings began to receive recognition and, in the 1960s and 1970s, they were exhibited nationally and internationally.

Nayombolmi continued to work creating rock art and it is recorded that, during the wet season of 1963/1964 he and Nym Djimongurr, a fellow rock artist, jointly created 18 rock paintings in the Burrungkuy (Nourlangie) area and this is now known as the Anbangbang Gallery. The Anbangbang Gallery includes some of the most iconic rock art imagery from Australia and is visited by hundreds of thousands of tourists each year.

In addition to creating new works Nayombolmi restored older paintings to retain the power of the ancestors and spirits they depict.

Nayombolmi died on 14 August 1967 at Mudginberri Station.

== Legacy ==
Although recognised as a significant artist in his lifetime Nayombolmi's rock art works were not closely documented until the 1980s by Ivan Haskovec and Hillary Sullivan, George Chaloupka, and Paul S.C. Taçonwho worked alongside Nipper Kabirriki, to record information about him and his artwork. Their research, and other research carried out in the following years found approximately 650 pieces of art work distributed over a 1,800 square kilometre area and that the number of paintings vary from 1 to 55 at a single site.

His classificatory granddaughter Josie Maralngurra said that Nayombolmi and her father Djimongurr ‘always left painting behind’ if they camped more than a day in a shelter'.

One of Nayombolmi's bark paintings was included in the National Museum of Australia's Old Masters exhibition in 2013 and one of his rock art figures was reproduced on the bicentennial $10 note in 1988 (Australian).
