= Hibbertia solanifolia =

Scientific classification
- Kingdom: Plantae
- Clade: Tracheophytes
- Clade: Angiosperms
- Clade: Eudicots
- Order: Dilleniales
- Family: Dilleniaceae
- Genus: Hibbertia
- Species: H. solanifolia

Binomial name
- Hibbertia solanifolia Toelken

Species of flowering plant

Hibbertia solanifolia is a species of flowering plant in the family Dilleniaceae and is endemic to the Top End of the Northern Territory in Australia. It is a spreading to low-lying shrub with ridged branches, elliptic leaves and yellow flowers usually arranged singly in leaf axils, with 34 to 38 stamens arranged in groups around three densely scaly carpels.

== Description ==
Hibbertia solanifolia is a spreading to low-lying shrub that typically grows to a height of up to 1 m (3 ft 3 in) and has strongly ribbed branches that are more or less triangular in cross-section. The foliage is covered with rosette-like hairs. The leaves are elliptic, mostly 25–45 mm (0.98–1.77 in) long and 15–30 mm (0.59–1.18 in) wide on a petiole 2–5 mm (0.079–0.197 in) long. The flowers are arranged singly or in pairs in leaf axils, each flower on a thread-like peduncle 15–22 mm (0.59–0.87 in) long, with linear bracts 1.6–1.8 mm (0.063–0.071 in) long at the base. The five sepals are joined at the base, the outer sepal lobes 4.1–4.5 mm (0.16–0.18 in) long and 3.5–3.9 mm (0.14–0.15 in) wide, and the inner lobes slightly shorter. The five petals are egg-shaped with the narrower end towards the base, yellow, 6.3–8.8 mm (0.25–0.35 in) long and there are 34 to 38 stamens arranged in groups around the three densely scaly carpels, each carpel with two ovules.

== Taxonomy ==
Hibbertia solanifolia was first formally described in 2010 by Hellmut R. Toelken in the Journal of the Adelaide Botanic Gardens from specimens collected by Clyde Robert Dunlop near Nourlangie Creek in 1973. The specific epithet (solanifolia) means "Solanum-leaved", referring to the similarity of the leaves to those of some Australian species of Solanum.

== Distribution and habitat ==
This hibbertia grows in sandy soils near watercourses and on sandstone near the Alligator and Goomadeer Rivers areas in the Top End of the Northern Territory.

== Conservation status ==
Hibbertia solanifolia is classified as "near threatened" under the Northern Territory Government Northern Territory Government Territory Parks and Wildlife Conservation Act 1976.

== See also ==
- List of Hibbertia species
