= Samuel Manggudja =

Australian Aboriginal artist

- Born: 1909; Goomadeer River Region, Northern Territory, Australia
- Died: 1983 (aged 73–74)
- Other names: Samuel Garnarradj Manggudja, Samuel Manggudja Garnarradj, Samuel Garnarradj
- Known for: Indigenous Australian art

Samuel Manggudja (1909 – 1983), was an Aboriginal Australian artist from West Arnhem Land and part of the Kunwinjku Language group. His artistic works drew heavily from rock art styles and often featured depictions of spirits. His paintings are owned by a number of prominent institutions such as the Berndt Museum of Anthropology and the Art Gallery of New South Wales.

== Early life ==
Manggudja was born in the Goomadeer River Region of the Northern Territory where he was raised in the bush. As a boy, his father moved him to the Goulburn Island Mission, on South Goulburn Island, to attend school. In 1930, he moved to Gunbalanya where he resided until his death in 1983.

== Career ==
Outside of creating art, Manggudja became notable for his work with anthropologists in recording and preserving Aboriginal life. Beginning in 1949, he worked with anthropologists Ronald and Catherine Berndt to record the names and language groups of many Aboriginal Artists.

By the early 1960s he was working with Reverend Gowan Armstrong and other artists, such as Spider Namirrki Nabunu, on a project to raise funds for community initiatives by creating and selling art.

In 1969, he participated in Peter John Carroll's research by narrating traditional stories in his native language, Kunwinjku. At the time, Carroll was a student at the Australian National University.

He was also one of the first appointed members of the Australia Council's Aboriginal Arts Board, serving from 1973-1975.

He was awarded a federal grant, alongside 3 other artists from Gunbalanya, in 1975 to produce writings in Kunwinjku.

== Selected Artworks ==
Manggudja's works are held by a number of prominent collections and have been shown in exhibitions such as Crossing Country at the Art Gallery of New South Wales in 2004 and They Are Meditating at the Museum of Contemporary Art Australia in 2008.

Artworks
Title	Year	Collection
Namorrordo (Figure with the Long Fingers)	1960	Art Gallery of New South Wales
Man with Leprosy	1961	Art Gallery of New South Wales
A Man with Women	c. 1961	Art Gallery of New South Wales
Rainbow Serpent	unknown	QAGOMA
