= Flora of Kakadu National Park =

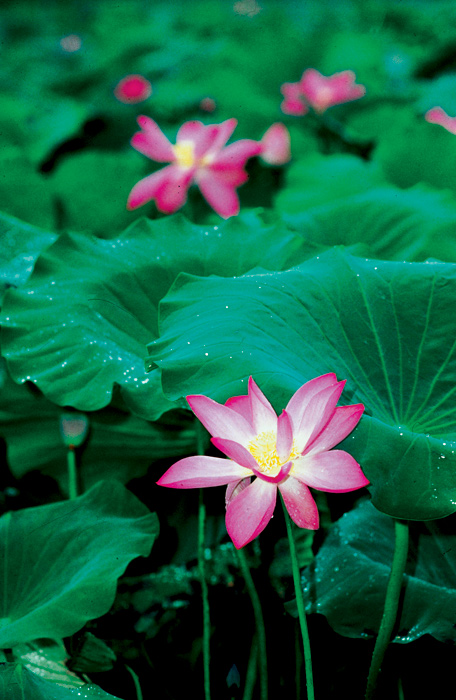
Lotus Flower – Kakadu National Park

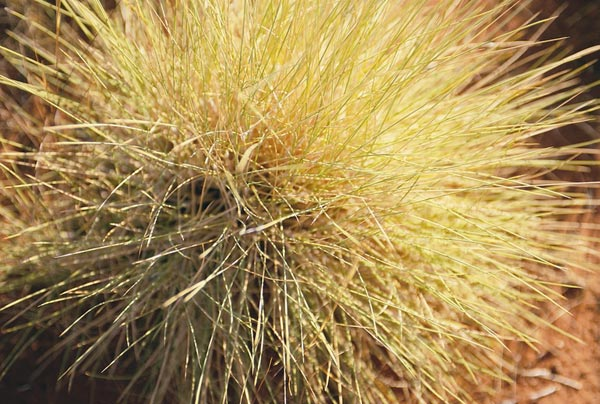
Spinifex grass – Kakadu National Park

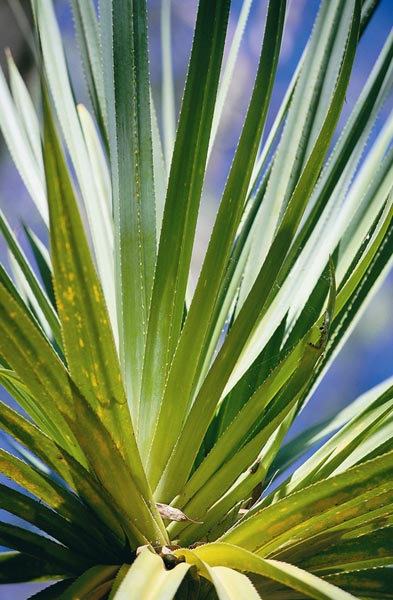
Pandanus spec. Kakadu National Park

This is a list of plants commonly found in Kakadu National Park, Northern Territory of Australia. Where known, common names are given in English and in Gun-djeihmi, a commonly spoken indigenous language in the area, are given in parentheses.

- Barringtonia actuangula (Freshwater Mangrove / An-galnggi) – a small, spreading tree that grows on the banks of freshwater creeks, rivers and swamps. It develops hanging, bright-red flowers between September and December. It is also known as the 'itchy tree': small caterpillars feed on the leaves during the wet season and cause localised skin irritation if touched.
- Allosyncarpia ternata (Allosyncarpia / An-binik) – a large, hardy evergreen that is restricted to the stone country of Kakadu and Arnhem Land.
- Banksia dentata (tropical banksia / Guibuk) – the only Banksia found in the Top End. It has distinctive serrated leaves and the characteristic banksia flower, which appears between January and April.
- Brachychiton paradoxus (Red-flowered Kurrajong / An-marrenarnak) – a small, often straggly tree that is widespread on the lowlands. It is deciduous in the dry season, when bright-red bell-shaped flowers appear on short stems from the branches.
- Buchanania obovata (Green Plum / An-dudjmi) – a medium-sized tree with large, thick leathery leaves. Bunches of green grape-sized plums appear in October to December; they are considered to be some of the best bush tucker around.
- Calytrix exstipulata (Turkey Bush / Anbarndarr) – common throughout the lowlands. It bears masses of pink-purple flowers between May and August.
- Cochlospermum fraseri (Kapok Bush / An-djedj) – deciduous in the dry season, from May to August, and has distinctive bright-yellow flowers. Its large, fragile pods are filled with a dense, soft cotton-like material.
- Curcuma australasica (Native Ginger) – an attractive leafy annual that grows from a tuber. Its hot pink flowers can be seen at Ubirr and Nourlangie Rock in the wet season. It is also related to the turmeric plant, a native of Asia.
- Erythrophleum chlorostachys (Cooktown Ironwood / An-dubang) – a tall, spreading tree with distinctive rounded dark-green leaves. Late in the dry season it puts out new leaves that are a bright lime-green. The tree's timber is extremely hard and termite resistant. All parts of the tree are highly poisonous to mammals.
- Eucalyptus miniata (Darwin Woollybutt / An-djalen) – grows to 10–20 metres; it has dark, rough bark on the lower half of its trunk and smooth, white bark on the upper half. Bright-orange flowers appear between May and August.
- Ficus virens (Banyan / An-borndi) – a large spreading tree with aerial roots and large prop roots from the major branches. It is a strangler fig with edible fruits and makes a great shade tree.
- Grevillea pteridifolia (Fern-leafed Grevillea / An-dadjek) – a medium-sized slender tree with long, narrow silver foliage. The flowers are bright orange and appear from May to August. The nectar from the flowers attracts many birds.
- Hibiscus tiliaceus (Beach hibiscus) – a small tree, 5 to 8 metres high, commonly found in monsoon pockets along the coast and river banks. It has a large yellow flower with a dark maroon centre.
- Livistona humilis (Sand Palm / An-gulalurrudj) – a slender fan palm with small yellow flowers on long spikes. Aboriginal people use it for medicines, fibre, dye and food.
- Melaleuca argentea (Silver-leafed Paperbark / Gun-god) – a large, spreading tree commonly seen along the waterways. Its pale-yellow flower spikes appear mainly between June and October and produce a sickly sweet fragrance that attracts many animals.
- Nelumbo nucifera (Red Lily / Wurrmarninj) – grows in lowland wetlands. Its leaves are very large and stand erect above the water. Large, fragrant deep-pink flowers appear between March and November.
- Nymphaea violacea (Blue Lily / Barradjungga) – commonly seen along the margins of billabongs. Its violet-tipped white flowers appear between January and July. The seeds and stems can be eaten raw; the tuberous underground bulbs can be eaten after cooking.
- Pandanus aquaticus (Water Pandanus / An-djimdjim) – commonly grows along the banks of permanent freshwater streams. Its fruit is inedible.
- Pandanus basedowii (Sandstone Pandanus / An-more) – grows only in the sandstone areas of Kakadu and Arnhem Land.
- Pandanus spiralis (Spiral Pandanus / An-yakngarra) – grows in a broad range of habitats, often in dense stands. Aboriginal people use it for medicines, fibre and food.
- Pityrodia jamesii – a shrub that grows on rocky areas in pockets of sandy soil. Pink-white flowers appear in September to December. The shrub's sticky, fragrant leaves are the main food of Leichhardt's grasshopper.
- Sorghum spp. (Spear Grass / An-ngulubu) – grows to over 2 metres and becomes the dominant understorey plant towards the end of the wet season.
- Terminalia ferdinandiana (Billy Goat Plum / An-morlak) – harvested commercially outside of Kakadu and marketed as the Kakadu plum. It is a medium-sized tree with large broad leaves. It is deciduous in the dry season and between March and June and bears edible fruits known to have exceptionally high levels of vitamin C.
- Utricularia fulva (Yellow bladderwort) – a small orchid-like plant that grows along sandy creek banks.

== See also ==
- Protected areas of the Northern Territory
- Uranium mining controversy in Kakadu National Park
- Ranger Uranium Mine
- Kakadu plum
