= Ubirr =

Rock formation in Kakadu National Park

Coordinates: 12°24′34.06″S 132°57′33.36″E

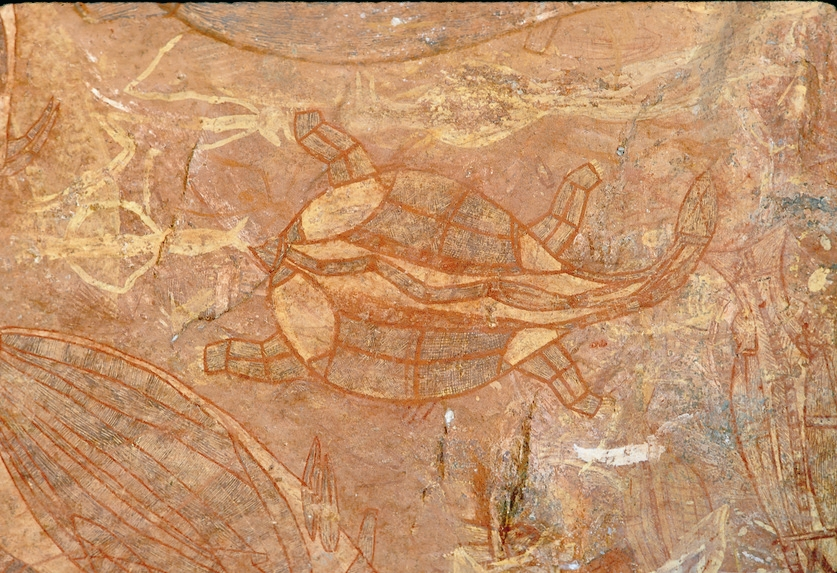
Rock painting at Ubirr

Ubirr, once referred to as Obiri Rock, so-named by C. P. Mountford, is a rock formation within the East Alligator region of Kakadu National Park in the Northern Territory of Australia, and is known for its rock art. It consists of a group of rock outcrops on the edge of the Nadab floodplain where there are several natural shelters that have a collection of Aboriginal rock paintings, some of which are many thousands of years old. The art depicts certain creation ancestors as well as animals from the area such as barramundi, catfish, mullet, goannas, long-necked turtles, pig-nosed turtles, rock ringtail possums, and wallabies.

From the top of Ubirr rock there is a panoramic view of the floodplains and escarpments.

Ubirr is approximately 40 km from Jabiru along a sealed road. The road is low-lying, so access can be restricted during periods of heavy rain. A short walk from the car park takes visitors past the main art sites to the foot of Ubirr Rock.

The rock faces at Ubirr have been continuously painted and repainted since 40,000 BC. Most paintings there were created about 2000 years ago. Some have been repainted right up to modern times. There are three main galleries of art accessible to visitors. National Park rangers, many of them Indigenous, give talks at all of these sites.

== Main gallery ==
The main gallery is perhaps the most photographed, and contains many examples of "X-ray art". Also in the main gallery can be seen paintings of white men with their hands on hips, and, high up, Mimi spirits, who are so thin that they can slip in and out of cracks in the rock. It is a puzzle how the artists managed to reach these bits of rock to paint the Mimi spirits. The local explanation is that the Mimi spirits painted the pictures themselves, and brought the rock down to ground level to do so.

At the northern end of the main gallery can be seen a painting of a thylacine, or Tasmanian tiger, which has been extinct in the area for about 2,000 years, and attests to the antiquity of the paintings.

== Rainbow Serpent Gallery ==
This is the most sacred site at Ubirr, and is traditionally a women-only site, although this rule is relaxed for non-indigenous tourists. This is the spot visited by the Rainbow Serpent or "Garranga'rreli", during her path across the top end of Australia, during the Dreaming. As she crossed the land, she "sang" the rocks, plants, animals, and people into existence. This path, or songline, is still a sacred path to the indigenous people who live in northern Australia.

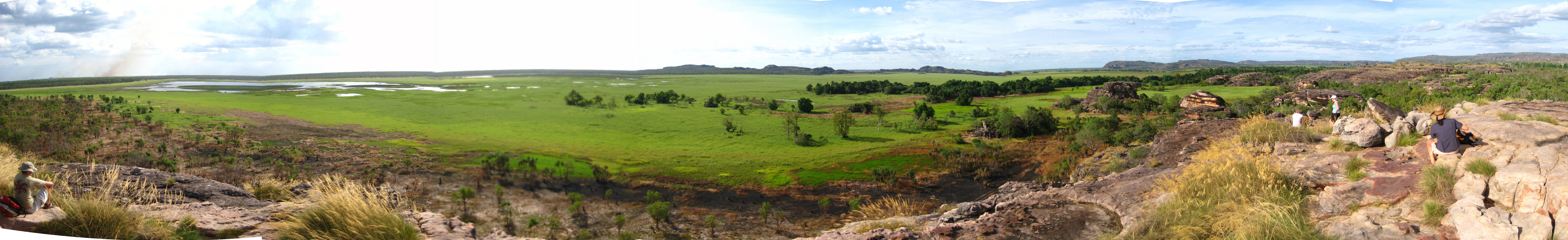
Panorama from Ubirr

== Gallery ==
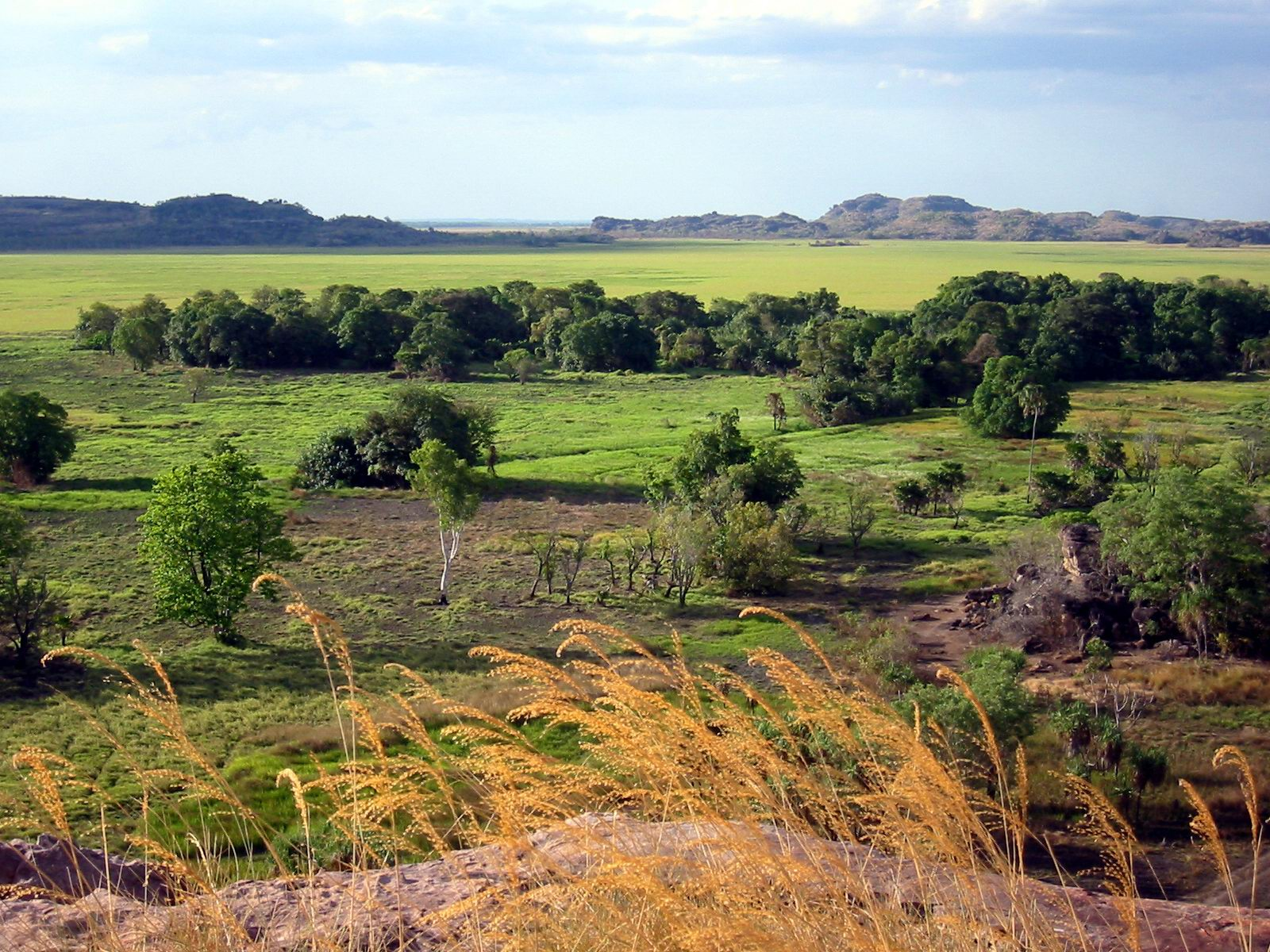
Ubirr

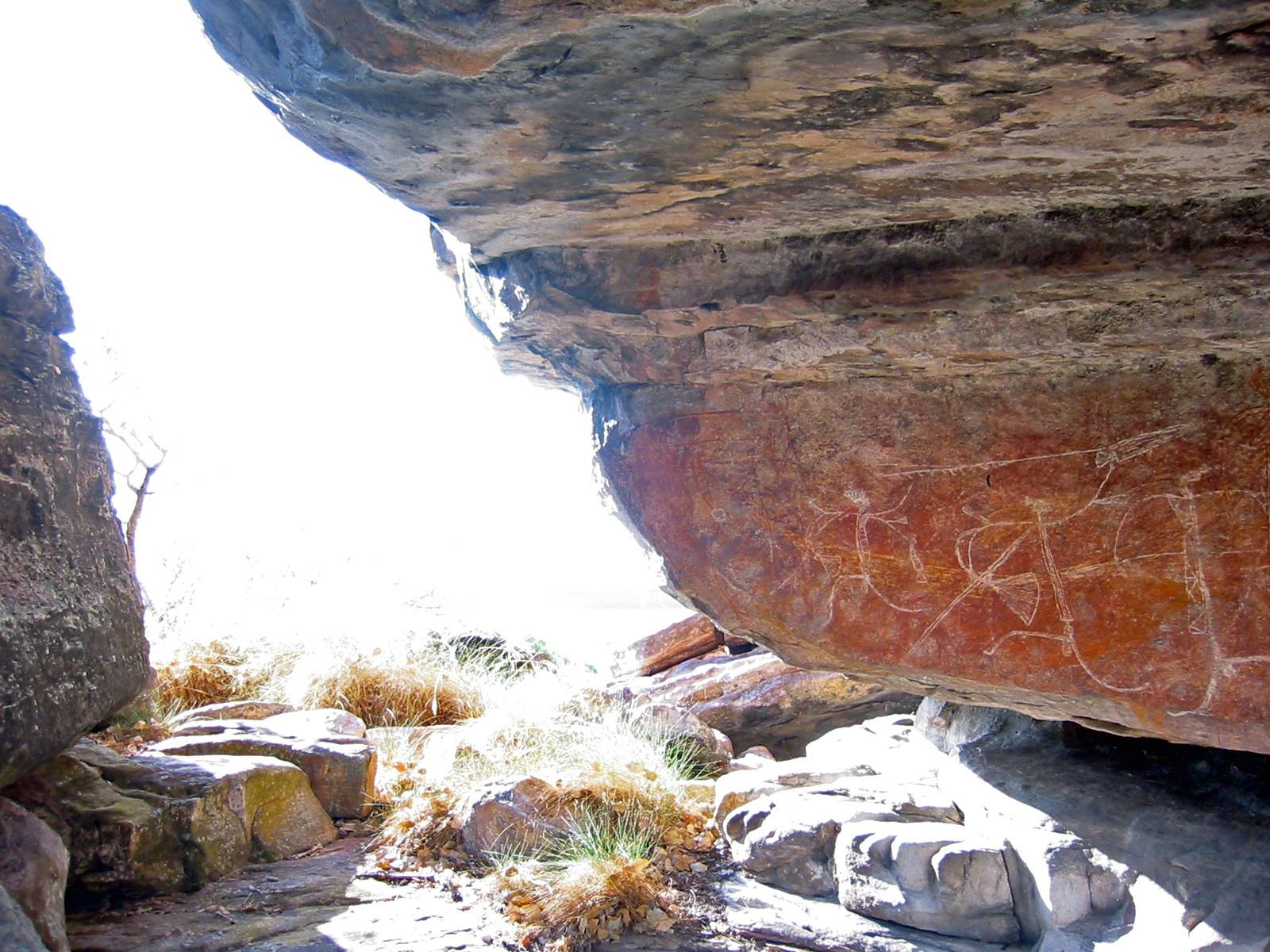

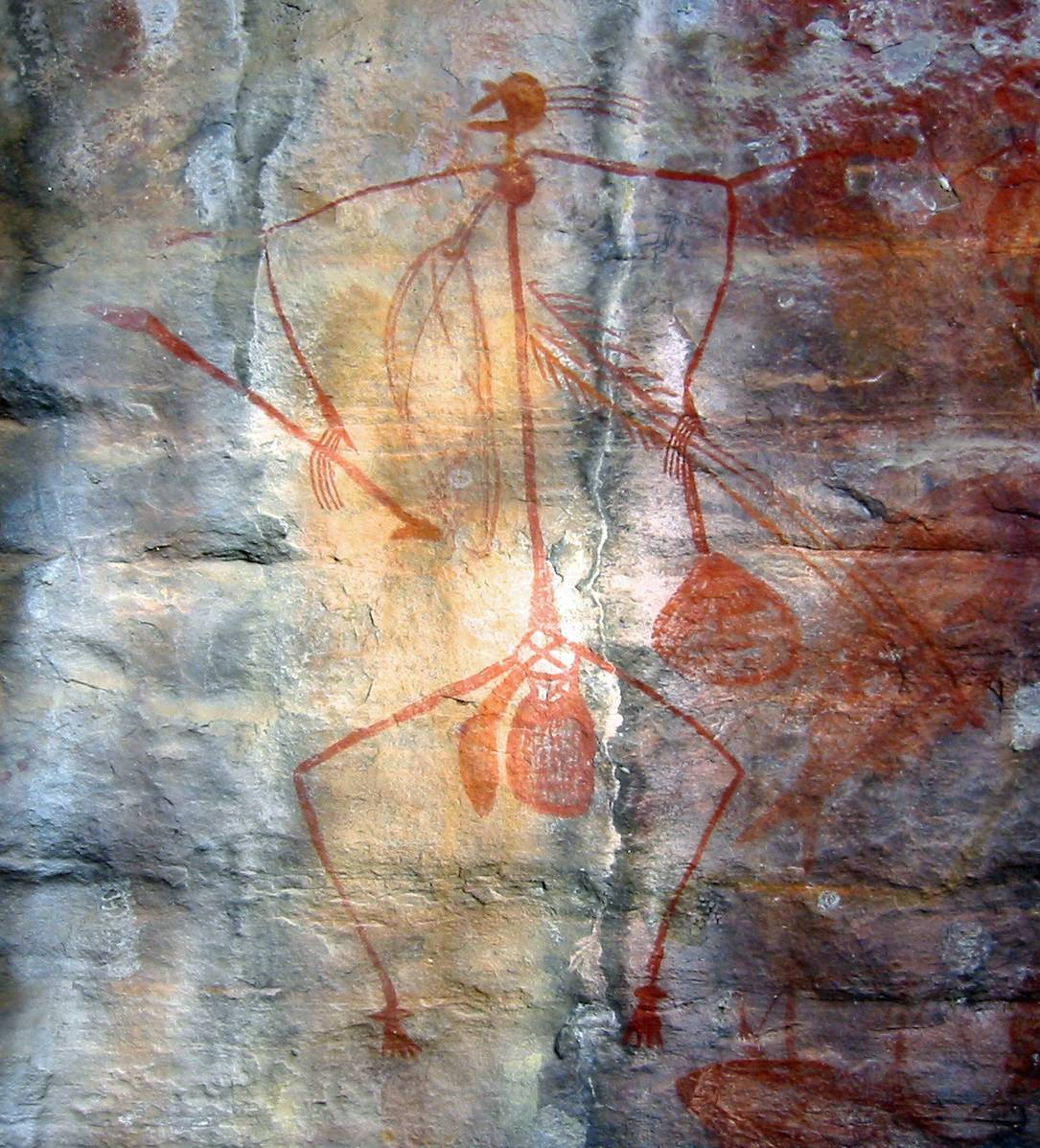

== See also ==
- Kakadu National Park
- Flora of Kakadu National Park
- Protected areas of the Northern Territory
- Terminalia ferdinandiana (Kakadu plum)
- Indigenous Australians
