= Nipper Kabirriki =

Australian Indigenous activist (c. 1910–1987)

Nipper Kabirriki, also recorded as Nippa Kapirigi (c. 1910 – 24 April 1987) was a Kundjeyhmi man, stockman and research collaborator from the Northern Territory of Australia.

His work was instrumental to the establishment of Kakadu National Park.

== Biography ==
Kabirriki was born in a rock shelter in Western Arnhem Land and his parents were Nakulidj and Maggie Mengkawindi and he was a member of the Badmardi Clan and was a Traditional Owner of Deaf Adder Gorge in the region. He spent much of his early life travelling around the Alligator Rivers region and Kabirriki remembers understanding that he had "to go around, every place" based on the season. One of his earliest memories was seeing the first feral water buffalo entering the region and spearing in, alongside his brother George Mingum, and eating the meat.

From the 1930s to the 1960s Kabirriki began worked for pastoralists, buffalo hunters, miners and drovers who were increasingly coming to the region and he took great pride in his work. His work with buffalo hunters led to him being featured in Buffaloes by Carl Warburton in 1934; this publication referred to him as Koperaki and detailed their first meeting, his significance within the community and many of the interactions that they had. Warburton described him "as a fine type of man, black or white, that I ever wish to meet".

In 1972 he became a research collaborator with Johan Kamminga, which contributed to the creation of the Kakadu National Park, during their work together they made two trips to Deaf Adder Gorge. Later, in 1978, Kabirriki worked with George Chaloupka, an expert in rock art, where they documented clan territories and previously unidentified rock art sites, including many by Nayombolmi, across what would become stage one of the National Park. Kabirriki offered insight into their cultural significance and, together, they were able to create a sequence to many of the paintings and the way they documented ecological changes that were happening. The relationship between the two men has been called “the most important single conduit for lodging the cultural significance of the Kakadu landscape in the archive and representing it in the public domain”. In 1981 he also assisted Rhys Jones's archaeological team.

Working as a research collaborator Kabirriki was generous with his knowledge and said of this:

I know all the story and law from when I was kid. My father and grandfather tell me. I remember any story.

— Nipper Kabirriki, 'Personal communication', as quoted in the Australian Dictionary of Biography

He viewed sharing his knowledge as a way of discharging his responsibilities of custodianship and the proper care of Kakadu.

He died on 24 April 1987 at Djuwarr billabong at Deaf Adder Gorge after asking Chaloupka to take him there to die on his own country. He was buried using customary mortuary practices that had not been carried out in the region for some years.

== Legacy ==
A portrait of Kabirriki, by Frank Hodgkinson, is in the collection of the Museum and Art Gallery of the Northern Territory, this work is entitles Portrait of Nipper Kapirigi. This portrait was shortlisted in the 1981 Archibald Prize.
