= Freshwater mangrove =

Freshwater mangrove is a common name for several trees of the genus Barringtonia and may refer to:

- Barringtonia acutangula
- Barringtonia racemosa
