= George Chaloupka =

Australian art historian and anthropologist

George Chaloupka OAM, FAHA (born Jiří Chaloupka; 6 September 1932 – 18 October 2011) was a Czech-born Australian art historian and anthropologist. He was an expert on Indigenous Australian rock art. He identified and documented thousands of rock art sites, and was a passionate advocate for Aboriginal Australian art, as longest continuing art tradition in the world. He is especially known for the much-debated assignation of a four-phase style sequence to rock art in Arnhem Land, and the term "Dynamic Figures", which he assigned to rock art described by him in Mirrar country of western Arnhem Land.

== Early life ==
Chaloupka was born in Týniště nad Orlicí, Czechoslovakia. At the age of 17 he left the country, fleeing the communist regime. Arriving in Australia in 1950 as a refugee, he stayed for a number of years in Perth.

In 1956, with his Noongar wife Janet, son Roman, older brother Milo, Janet's sister Maureen (married to Milo) and nephew Milani, the family set out for the Melbourne Olympics, travelling via Darwin in the Northern Territory, where they ended up staying after numerous car breakdowns. George and Janet went on to have two daughters, Eve and Pearl.

== Career ==
Deciding to stay in the Northern Territory, he found employment with the Water Resources Department. Working for the government as a hydrologist, he travelled widely across the Top End. It was in 1958 that he found the rock art galleries in the east of the territory. Chaloupka gazed at the ceiling of a cave covered with art "and his heart was lost".

Chaloupka joined the Northern Territory Museum, the main museum in the Northern Territory, in 1973, to begin his life's work as a rock art researcher. He worked there for over two decades. He developed his career to become a well-known rock art historian and finally Curator Emeritus at the museum.

In 1986, Chaloupka was a recipient of a grant from the Australian Institute of Aboriginal and Torres Strait Islander Studies, of which he was a member. He examined the protection and conservation of rock art of the Wardaman people at a site at Malgawo, East Arnhem Land.

His 1993 work, Journey in Time: The World's Longest Continuing Art Tradition: the 50,000 Year Story of the Australian Aboriginal Rock Art of Arnhem Land, was especially influential in creating awareness of the importance of Aboriginal rock art in Australia as well as internationally. In this work he worked with a collaborated with Nipper Kabirriki who became a long term friend of his. In it, Chaloupka wrote detailed investigations of the "Dynamic Figures" rock art of the Mirrar people, a clan of the Bininj people. Here he tried to describe a chronological sequence of styles to the art within this style, describing four phases of the style. Although the classification proved problematical and continues to be debated, it was a significant piece of work in that it identified important attributes of the style, and provided a basis for similar studies in the future. Paul Taçon refers to them in the study led by him on the Maliwawa Figures, published in 2020.

== Recognition and honours ==
- Churchill Fellowship, 1983
- Visiting fellow at the Department of Prehistory in the Research School of Pacific Studies at the Australian National University
- Inaugural President of the Australian Rock Art Research Association, presiding over the First AURA Congress, 1988
- Order of Australia, 1990
- Honorary Fellow of the Australian Academy of the Humanities, 1997

== Death and legacy ==
Chaloupka died in the Royal Darwin Hospital. A state funeral was held on 4 November 2011, with an Aboriginal smoking ceremony held as part of the funeral.

In 2008 the George Chaloupka Fellowship was established "to promote and support research and conservation of Aboriginal rock art located in Arnhem Land Plateau region in the Northern Territory of Australia".

== Selected works ==
- Burrunguy: Nourlangie rock. Northart, 1982
- The Rock art sites of Kakadu National Park : some preliminary research findings for their conservation and management, Australian National Parks and Wildlife Service, Canberra. (with Dan Gillespie & Australian National Parks and Wildlife Service) 1983
- From palaeoart to casual paintings: the chronological sequence of Arnhem Land Plateau rock art, Northern Territory Museum of Arts and Sciences, Darwin. (with Northern Territory Museum of Arts and Sciences) 1984
- Chronological sequence of Arnhem Land Plateau rock art. In: Jones, R. Archaeological research in Kakadu National Park. Canberra : Australian National Parks and Wildlife Service, 269-80. 1985
- Report on acquital [sic] of 1986 grants, Rock Art Protection Programme, Darwin, 1987
- 'Rock art of the Northern Territory' The Inspired Dream: Life as Art in Aboriginal Australia, no. 1988, pp. 12–19,110. 1988
- Retouch events. In: Retouch: maintenance and conservation of Aboriginal rock imagery / edited by Graeme K. Ward. Melbourne : Archaeological Publications, 1992; p. 12–16. 1992
- Journey in Time: The World's Longest Continuing Art Tradition: the 50,000 Year Story of the Australian Aboriginal Rock Art of Arnhem Land. Reed. 1993. ISBN 978-0-7301-0310-3.
