= Nourlangie Rock =

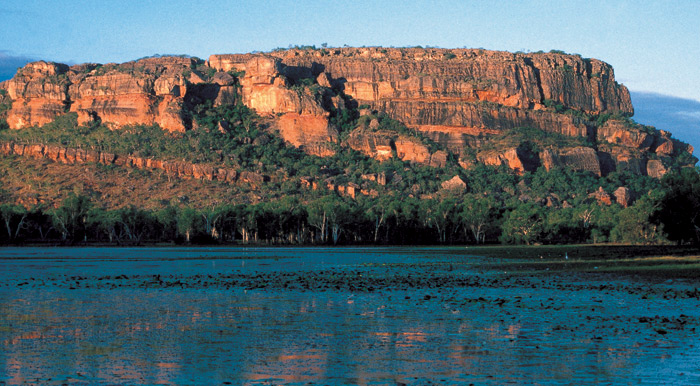
- Nourlangie Rock

- Coordinates: 12°51′42″S 132°48′45″E
- Country: Australia
- State: Northern Territory

Burrunggui (sometimes spelled Burrunguy, previously called Nourlangie Rock) is located in an outlying sandstone formation of the Arnhem Land Escarpment within the Kakadu National Park in the Northern Territory of Australia. It is the traditional Country of the Gun-djeihmi speaking people and according to traditional owners, was shaped by Ancestral beings in the creation period of the Dreaming (Chaloupka 1982 p. 6). It was included on the World Heritage Register. Kakadu National Park is included on UNESCO the World Heritage List due to its exceptional natural and cultural values.

Europeans were first in the area of Noulangie Rock in about 1845, after Ludwig Leichhardt’s explorations passed through the area. By the 1880s, European buffalo and buffalo shooters had moved into the area and local traditional owners joined their shooting parties. Traditional owners told the buffalo shooters about the Dreaming stories at Burrungui and the many names of all the natural features of the landscapes. Chaloupka argues that the Europeans couldn’t remember all of the names, and called ‘Nourlangie’, a confused pronunciation of the name of the area generally called ‘Nawulandja’.

== Rock art at Burrungui (Nourlangie) ==
There are a number of shelters in amongst this large outcrop. The shelters contain amazing paintings that represent the Aboriginal Dreaming, with depictions of Namandi spirits, both male and female figures and one with six fingers on each hand. Many paintings in the Burrungui area also depict European items and introduced animals. Pigments are mostly of yellow, white and red ochre, with red ochre being used as a chalk to draw on the rock surface in some places. Early art at the site is evidenced in handprints on the rock in red pigment, or gars being flung on the rock. The paintings at Burrungui are in the Mimi and x-ray style, with Mimi being older and representative of Dreaming Ancestral beings. There are even depictions of Thylacines (Tasmanian Tigers), known to have been extinct in the area for at least 3,500 years. Superimposition of many animals such as kangaroos layered over one another, assist in the establishment of a temporal sequence at the site, however there appears to still be much research and work needed at the site for this to occur.

The rock art faces many threats to its survival, including tourists and destruction from natural processes such as ant trail that go across the older panels at Burrungui, water damage and wasp nesting. Interpretive signage is present at the art sites to assist visitors in understanding these rock art treasures and the importance of their preservation.

=== Anbangbang ===
The Anbangbang Shelter drawings are some of the most famous in the National Park. One of the intricate paintings in Anbangbang shelter was created by Nayombolmi, an artist of the Bardmardi clan, who painted the images with his friends in the 1963 -64 wet season. Nayombolmi lived between 1895 and 1967 and is thought to have created around 604 paintings at 46 sites in Arnhem Land. Nayombolmi was also known as ‘Barramundi Charlie’ by some.

X-ray paintings are naturalistic depictions of animals that show the internal organs and other anatomical features, which were mostly painted by Aboriginal people in red and white ochre. One such painting created by Nayombolmi depicts anthropomorphic figures of Ancestral beings such as Namarrgon (lightning man), painted in the x-ray style using European blue, that Chaloupka said came from the blue pigment put in washing by Europeans as a toner to keep clothes white. Paintings and rock art such as this among the only rock art that provides absolute dating of when it was produced, as rock art is notoriously difficult to date.

Anbangbang was excavated by archaeologists in 1981 and was found to have first been occupied more than 6000 years ago, with some occasional use being up to 20,000 years ago and with intensification of site use occurring between 800 and 1200 years ago when the nearby lagoon was fully formed.

=== Nangawulurr ===
Nayombolmi also painted at Nangawulurr Shelter (formerly spelled Nangaloar). It is located on the northern side of Burrungui (Nourlangie Rock). Nangawulurr shelter features many styles of Aboriginal rock art that appear in other sites around the region in one area. It includes hand prints, Mimi figures in ceremonial dress, Ancestral beings, x-ray animals and dolphin-like creatures depicted in red ochre. It also features a white depiction of a two-masted sailing ship with an anchor and dingy, which may relate to the early European buffalo shooters in the area). Unfortunately due to the fame of the site for its amazing rock art, in the early 1970s tourists came and destroyed some features and even stole Aboriginal Ancestral Remains from the site.

== Gallery ==
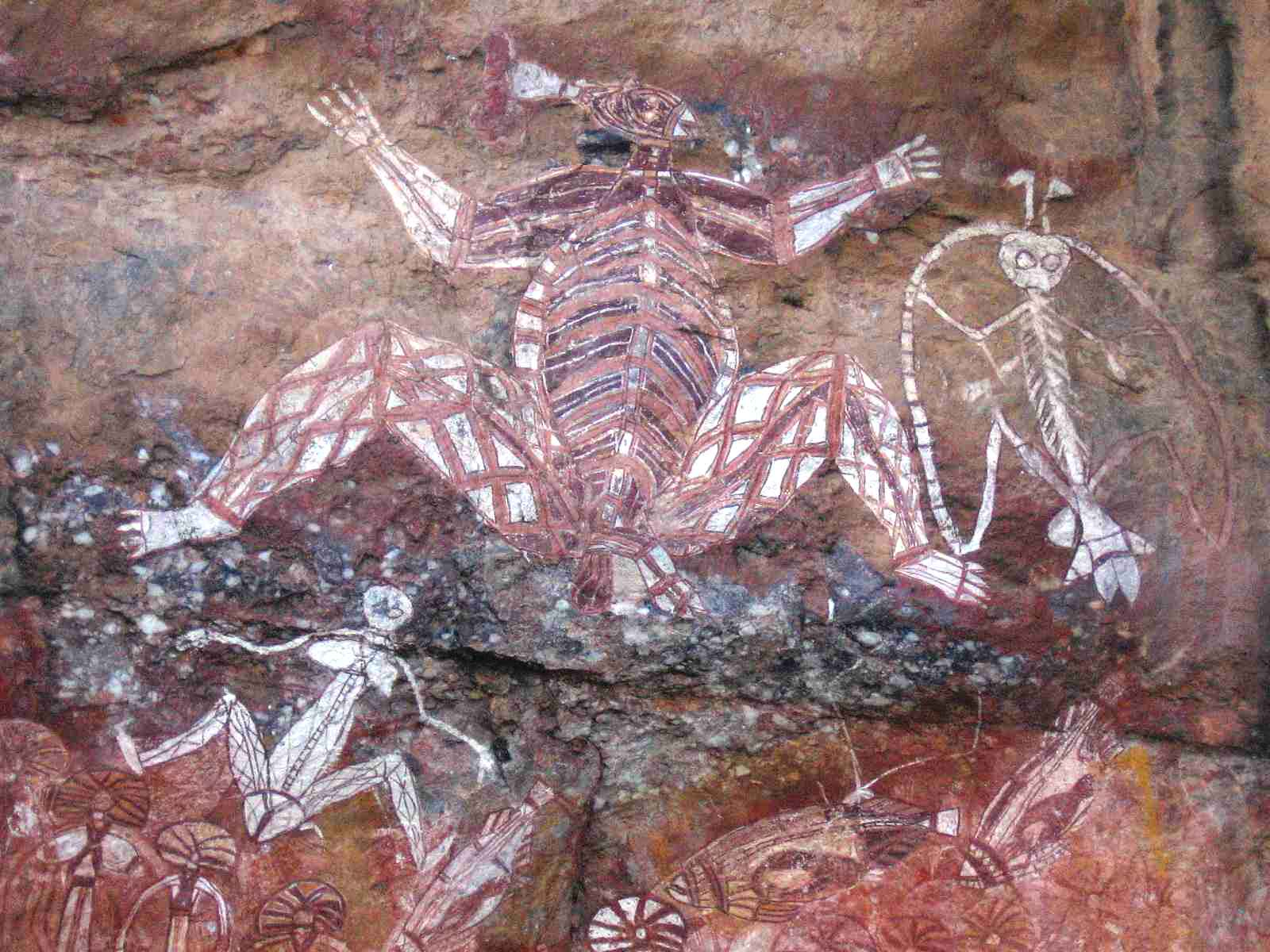

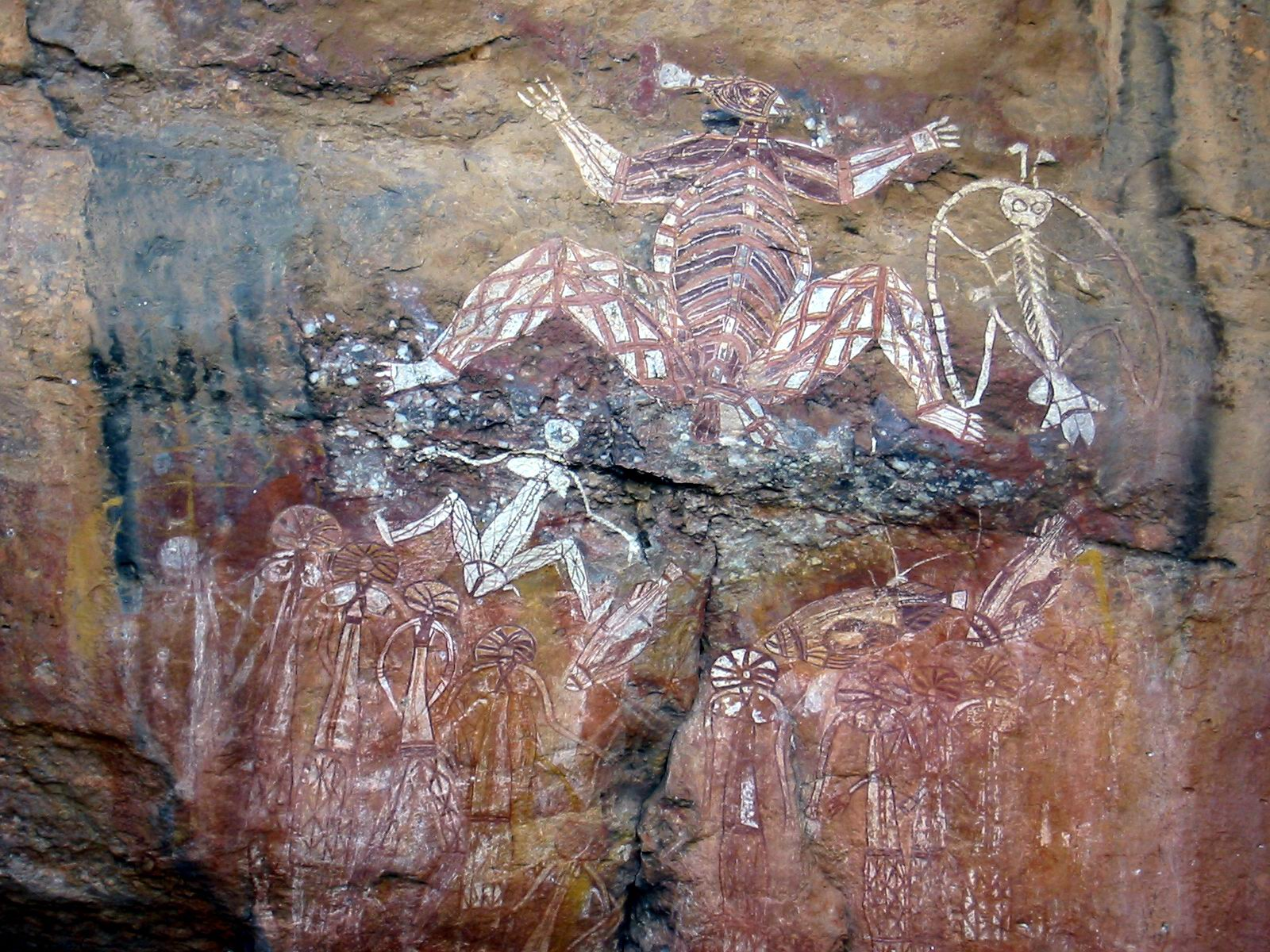

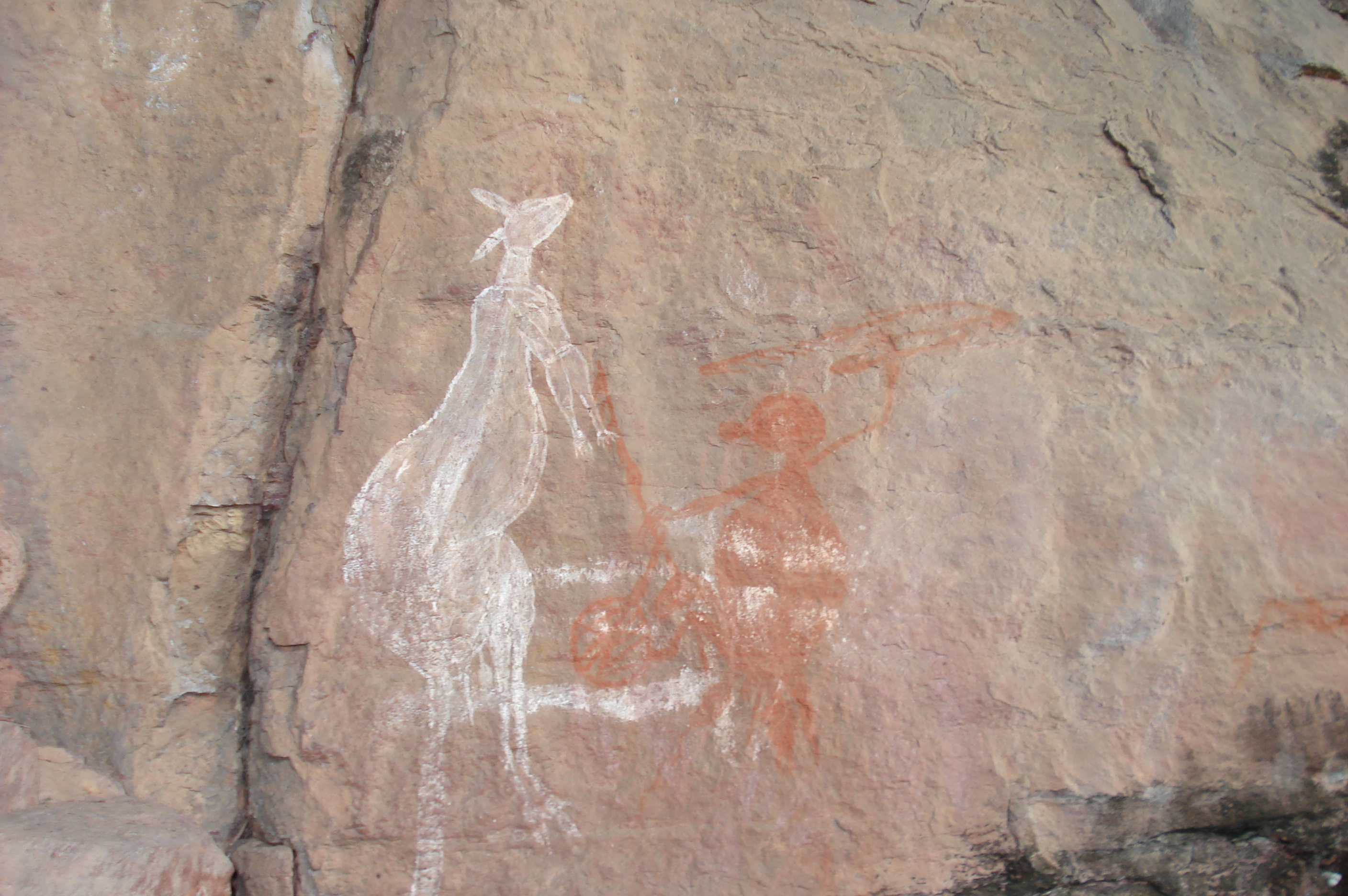

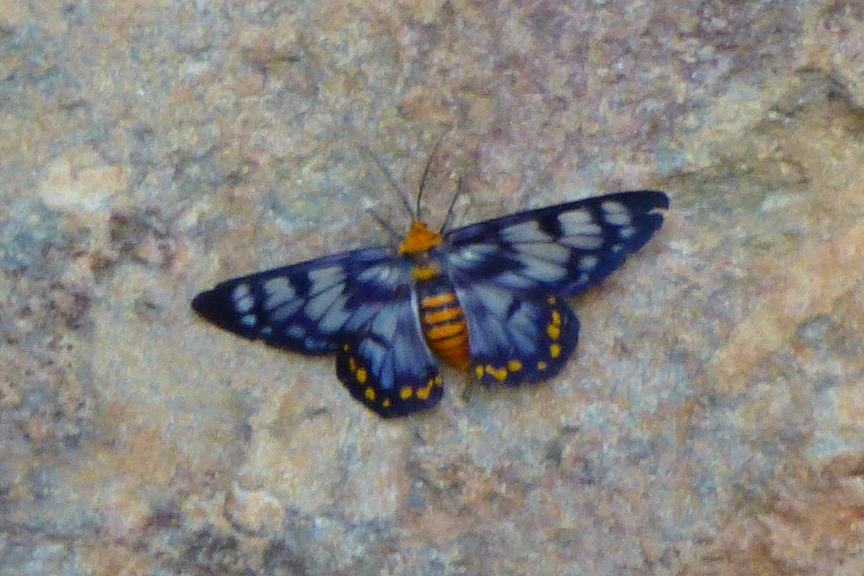

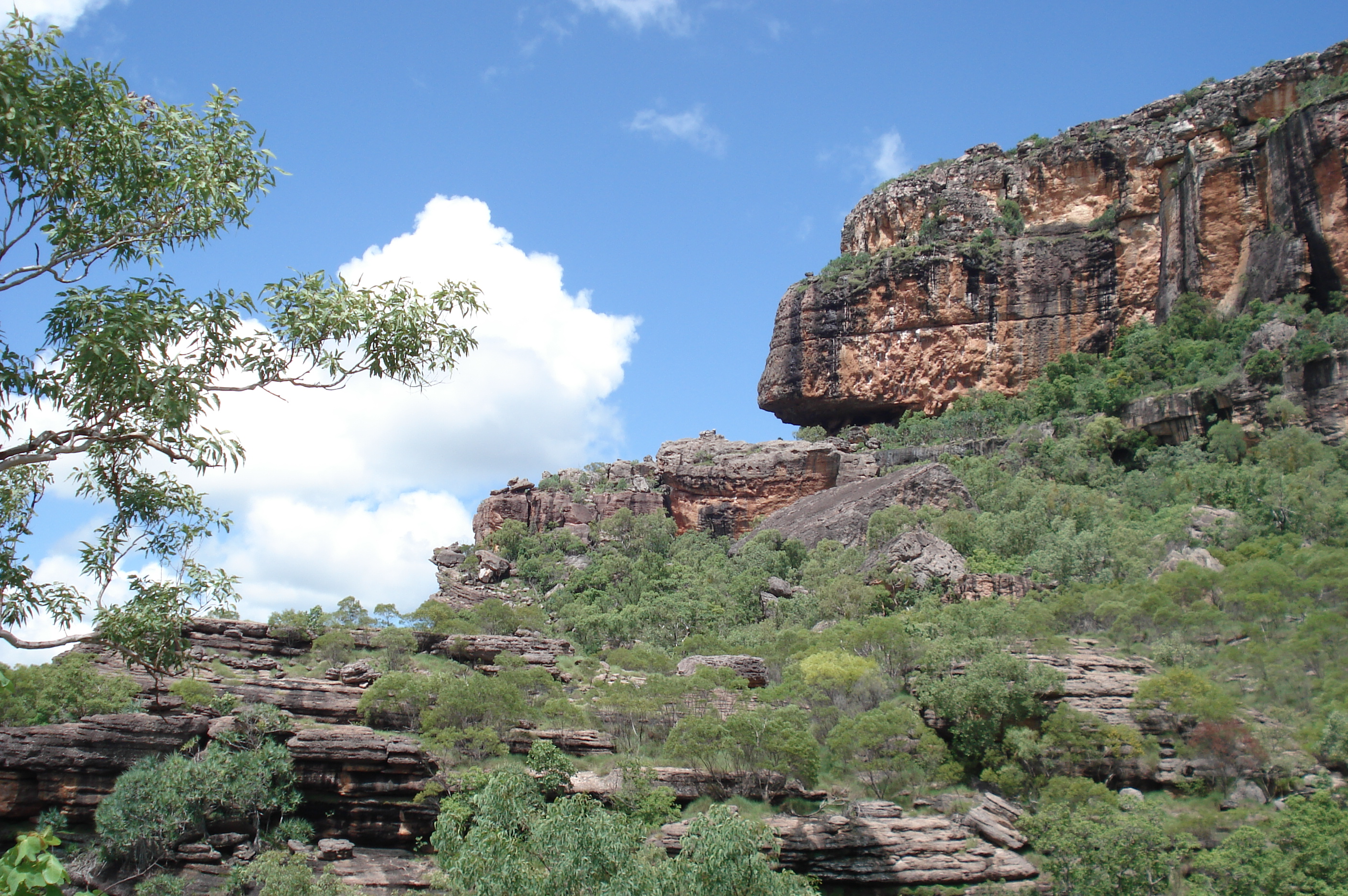

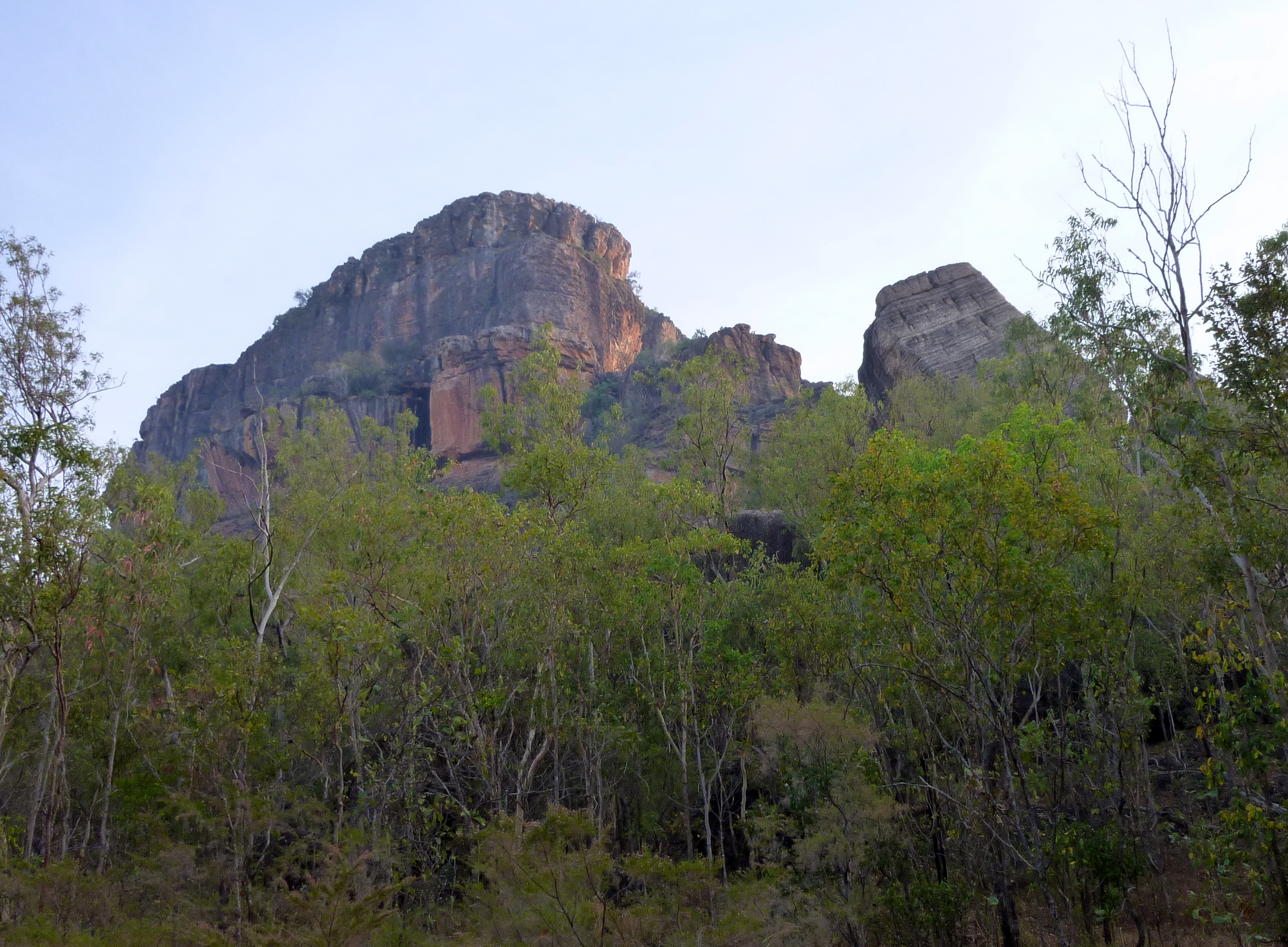

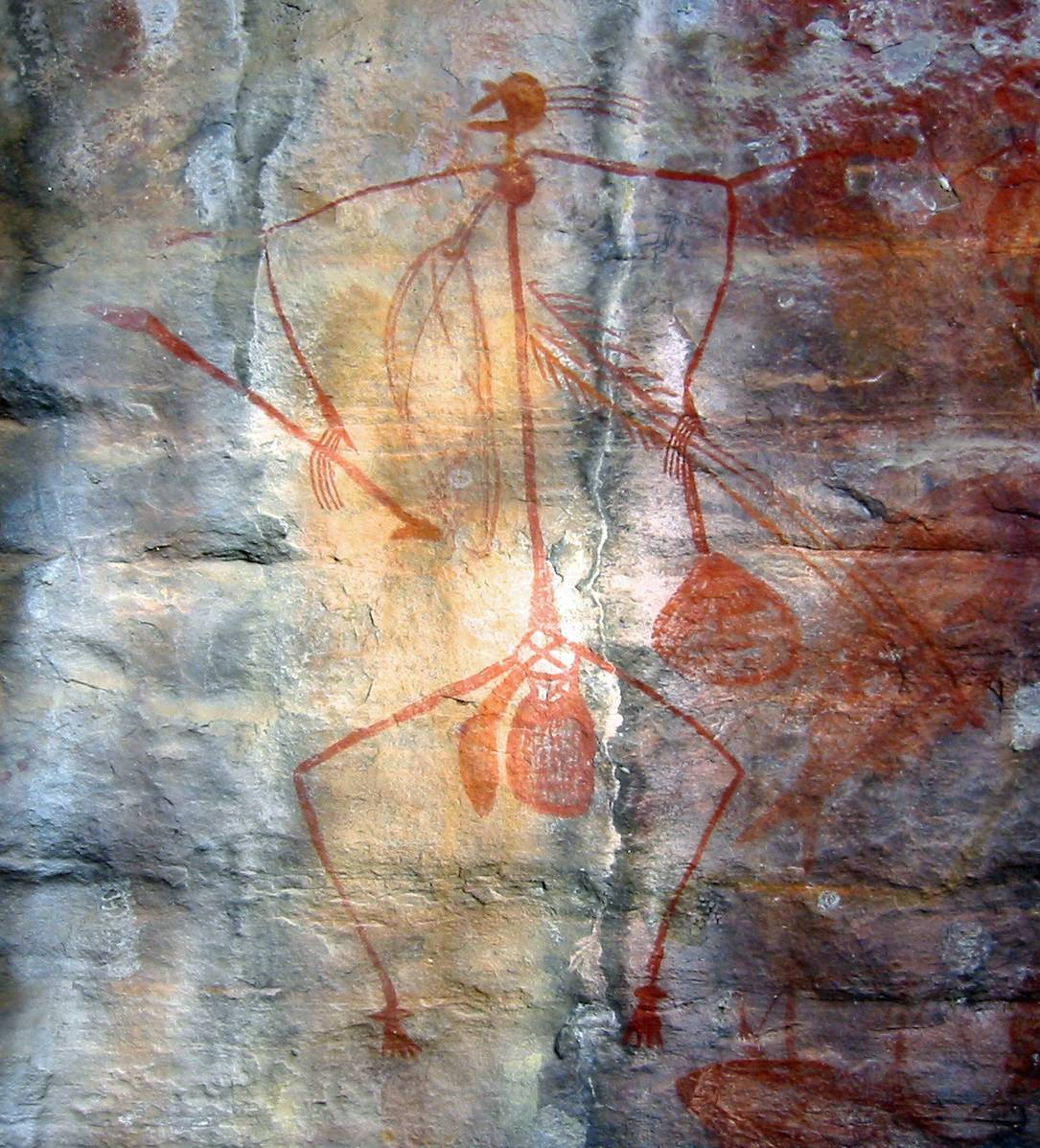

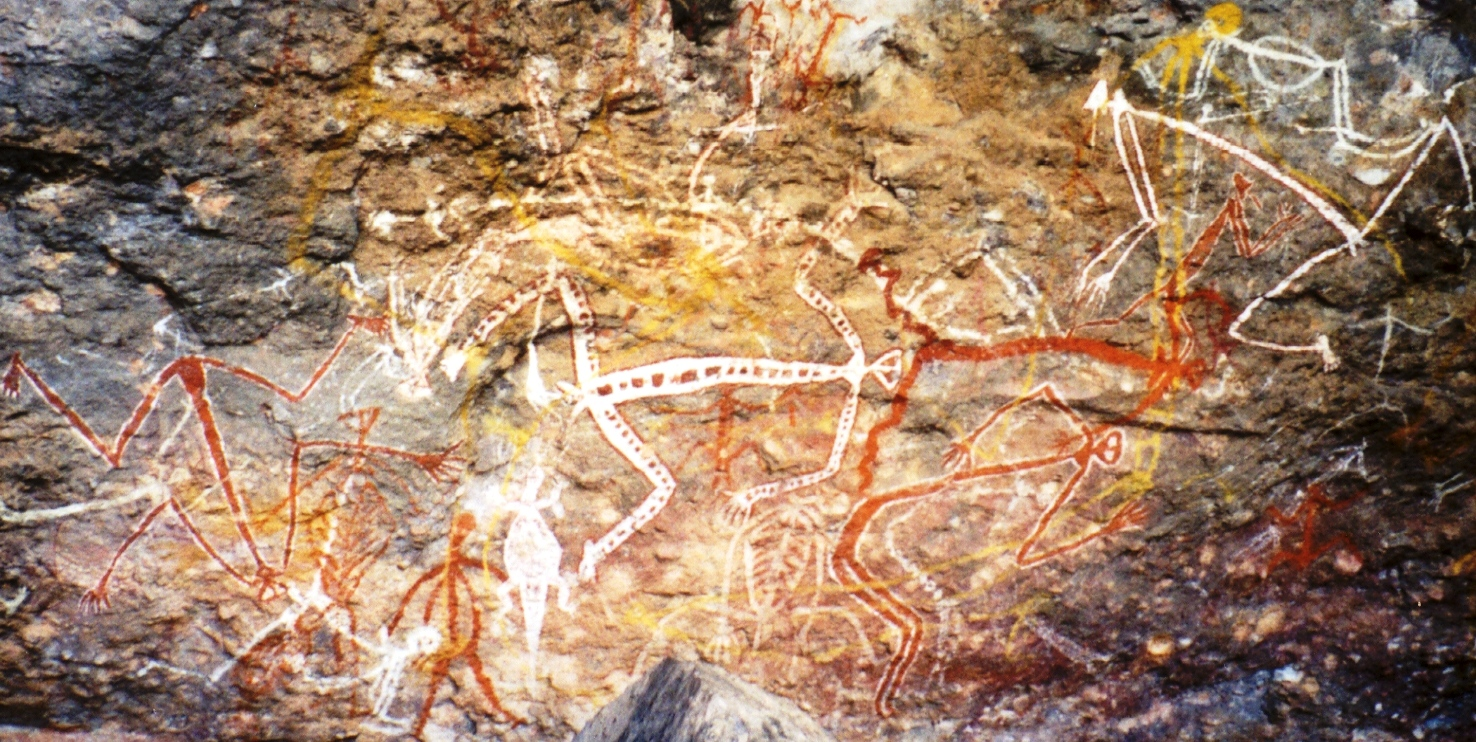

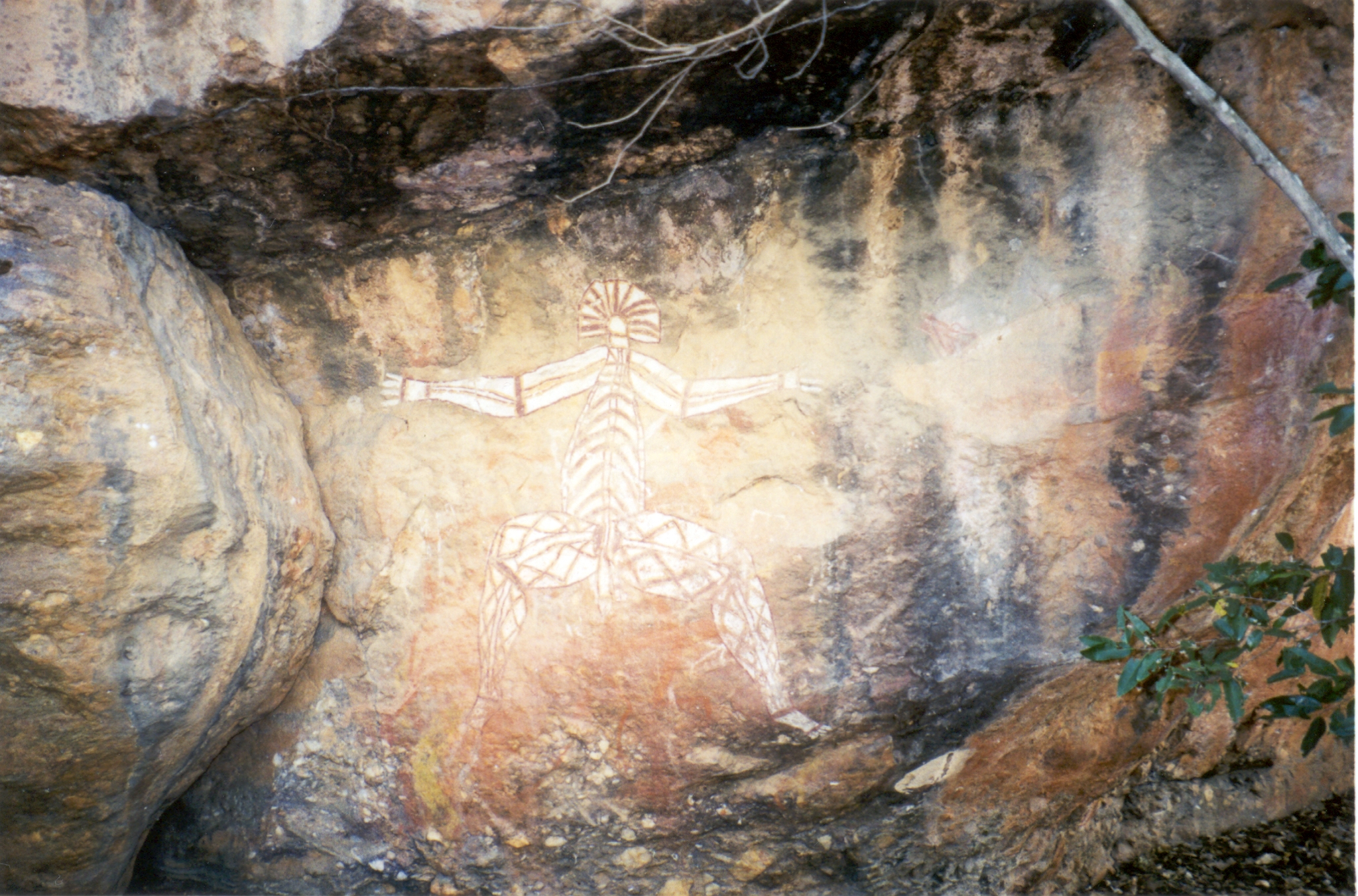

== See also ==
- Plants Kakadu National Park
- Protected areas of the Northern Territory
- Kakadu plum
- Indigenous Australians
