= Goomadeer River =

Goomadeer
- Location of the Goomadeer River mouth in the Northern Territory
- Etymology: from Kunwinjku 'Kumardderr'

Location
- Country: Australia
- Territory: Northern Territory

Physical characteristics
- Source
  - elevation: 274 m (899 ft)
- Mouth: Junction Bay
  - location: Australia
  - coordinates: 11°50′56″S 133°49′30″E
  - elevation: 0 m (0 ft)
- Length: 138 km (86 mi)
- Basin size: 5,684 km^{2} (2,195 sq mi)
- Discharge
  - average: 36.1 m^{3}/s (1,270 cu ft/s)

Basin features
- Tributaries
  - right: Gumardir River

The Goomadeer River is a river in the Northern Territory, Australia.

== Etymology ==
The name comes from the Kunwinjku Kumardderr, which is the name of an area that the river flows through. The name means literally 'at the silver-leaved paperbark', referring to Melaleuca argentea, known as mardderr in the Kunwinjku language.

== Description ==
The headwaters are located on the sandstone plateau fed by springs in Arnhem Land at an elevation of 274 metres (899 ft) and flows in a northerly direction through mostly uninhabited lands and eventually discharges into Junction Bay and the Arafura Sea. The only tributary of the river is the Gumardir River.

The estuary formed at the river mouth is in near pristine condition and occupies an area of 24.9 hectares (62 acres) of open water. It is riverdominated in nature with a tide dominated delta having a single channel and is surrounded by an area of 11.2 square kilometres (4 sq mi) covered with mangroves.

The catchment occupies an area of 5,684 square kilometres (2,195 sq mi) and is situated between the East Alligator River catchment to the west and the Liverpool River catchment to the east. It has an annual discharge of 1,140 gigalitres (1.491×10^{9} cu yd).

== Flora and fauna ==
The riparian vegetation of the river is in good condition but are declining as a result of the proliferation of feral pigs and buffalo and the invasion of some weed species.

19 species of fish are found in the river, including the Macleay's glassfish, barred grunter, sooty grunter, fly-specked hardyhead, northern trout gudgeon, gulf saratoga, barramundi, oxeye herring, rainbowfish, black-banded rainbowfish, bony bream, catfish, freshwater longtom, seven-spot archerfish and the sleepy cod.

The pig-nosed turtle, a threatened species of turtle, is known to inhabit sections of the river, but only in small populations.

== See also ==
- List of rivers of Australia § Northern Territory
