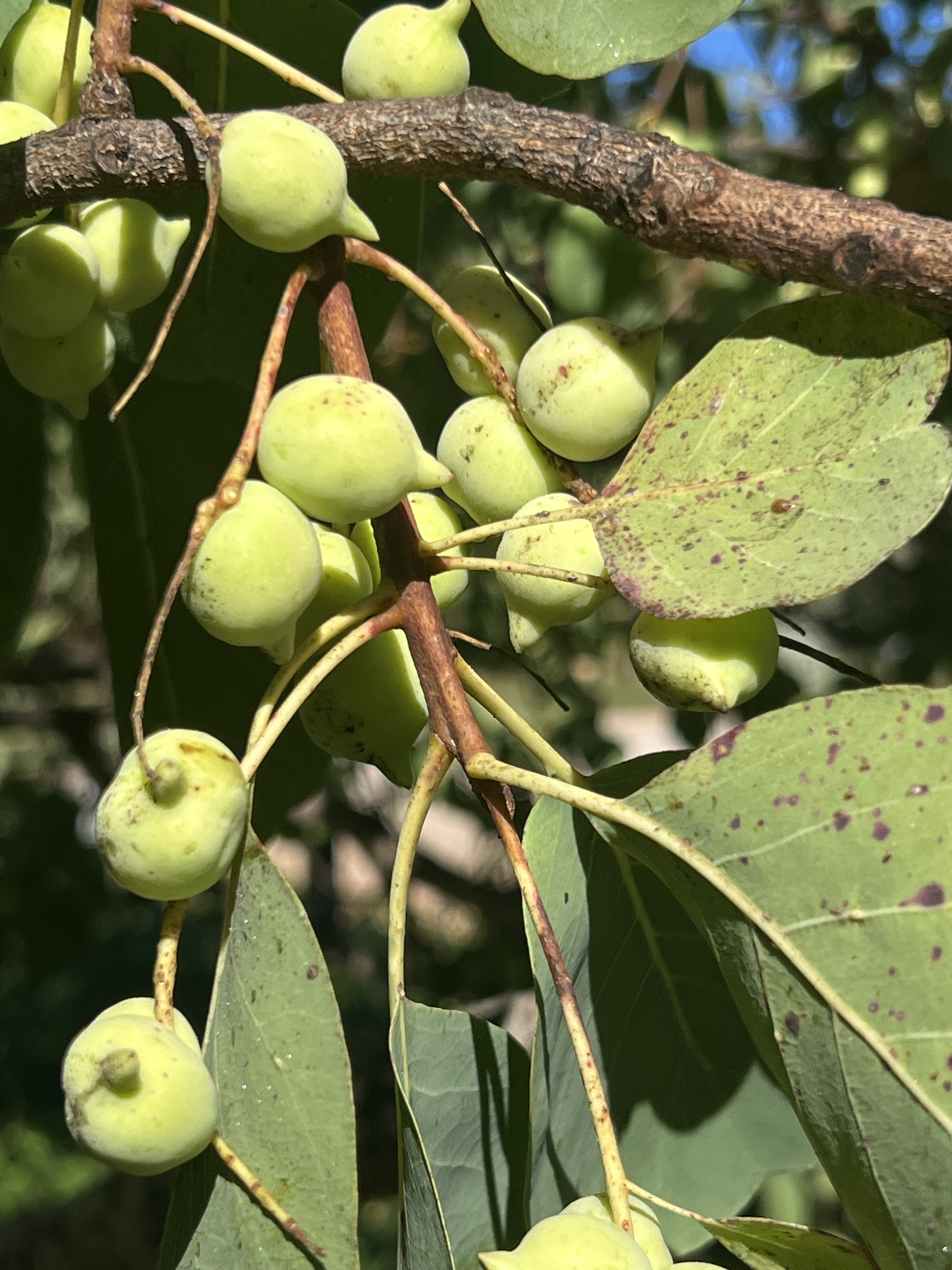

Conservation status
- Least Concern (IUCN 3.1)

Scientific classification
- Kingdom: Plantae
- Clade: Embryophytes
- Clade: Tracheophytes
- Clade: Angiosperms
- Clade: Eudicots
- Clade: Rosids
- Order: Myrtales
- Family: Combretaceae
- Genus: Terminalia
- Species: T. ferdinandiana

Binomial name
- Terminalia ferdinandiana Exell

Synonyms
- Terminalia edulis F.Muell.; Terminalia latipes subsp. psilocarpa Pedley

= Terminalia ferdinandiana =

Kakadu plum

Species of tree

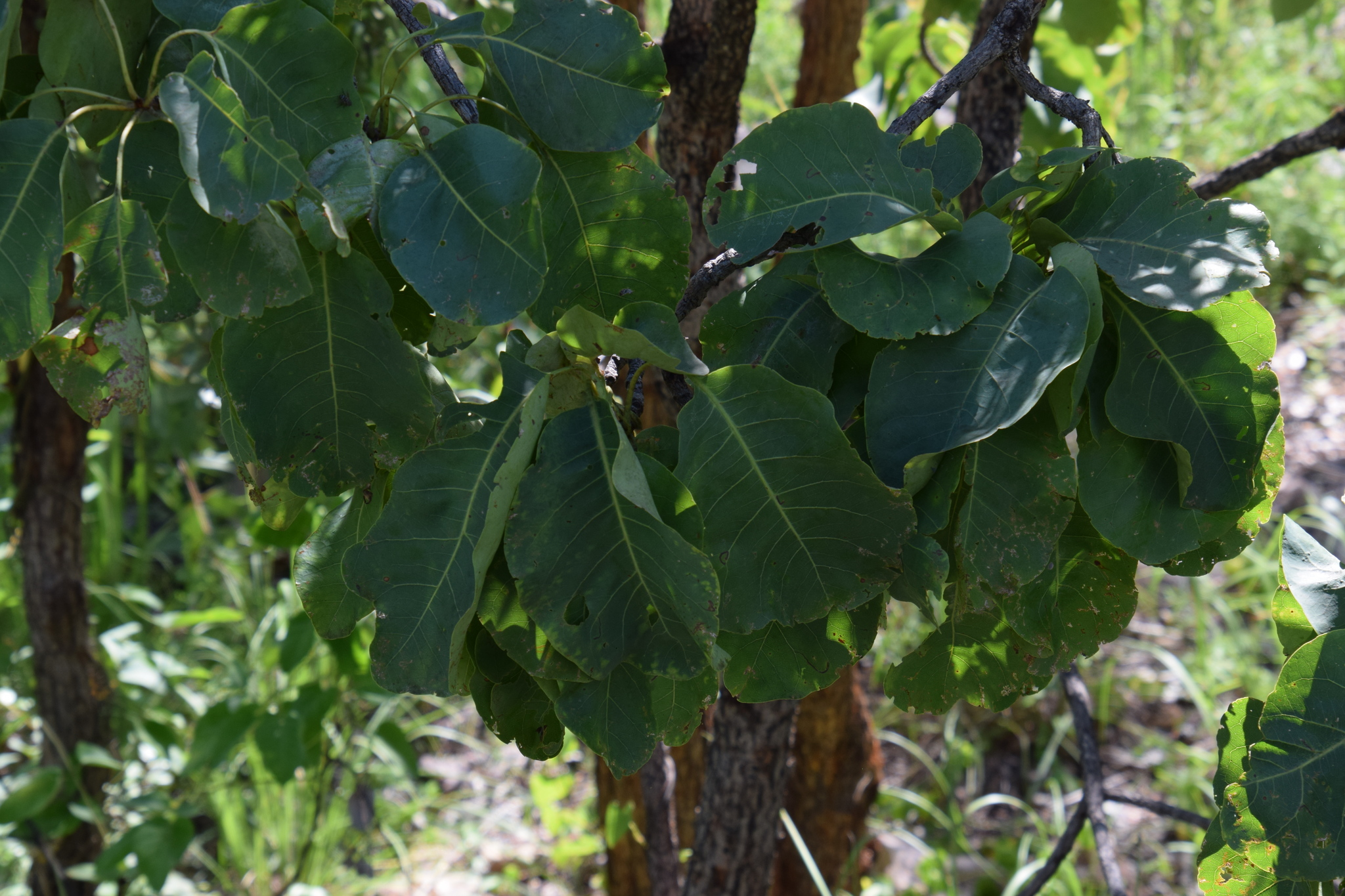
Foliage

Terminalia ferdinandiana, most commonly known as the Kakadu plum and also called the gubinge, billygoat plum, green plum, salty plum, murunga, mador and other names, is a flowering plant in the family Combretaceae, native to Australia, widespread throughout the tropical woodlands from north-western Australia to eastern Arnhem Land. Used as a traditional bush food and bush medicine for centuries, the fruit has especially high levels of vitamin C.

== Description ==
Terminalia ferdinandiana is a slender, small to medium-sized tree growing up to 14 m (46 ft) in height, with creamy-grey, flaky bark and deciduous pale green leaves. The flowers are small, creamy-white, perfumed, and borne along spikes in the leaf axils towards the ends of the branches. Flowering is from September to December or February (Southern hemisphere spring/summer). The leaf blades are strongly discolorous with a broadly elliptic to broadly ovate, occasionally obovate shape and are 11 to 33 centimetres (4.3 to 13.0 in) in length with a width of 8.5 to 23 centimetres (3.3 to 9.1 in) and have a rounded apex. The inflorescences are 16 to 19 centimetres (6.3 to 7.5 in) long and are glabrous throughout.

The fruit is yellow-green, about 2 cm (0.79 in) long and 1 cm (0.39 in) in diameter, almond-sized with a short beak at the tip, and contain one large seed. They ripen from March onwards, with the ripe fruits being very pale, sometimes pinkish.

The species epithet "ferdinandiana" was created by A.W. Exell in honour of the first European botanist to collect and describe Kakadu plum, Ferdinand Mueller, who had originally given the species the nomen illegitimum (illegitimate name), Terminalia edulis.

== Range and habitat ==
The tree is widespread throughout the tropical woodlands from northwestern Australia to eastern Arnhem Land. It is found along the coast in the Kimberley region of Western Australia as far west as Broome extending east into the Northern Territory where it is found mostly in the western portion of the top end from the Western Australian border to Arnhem Land but is found as far east as Limmen National Park.

It grows in a variety of habitat including sandplains, floodplains, creek beds, ridges, among vine thickets and on the edges of areas of mangroves. It grows in sandy, peaty or clay soils around sandstone or ironstone, and is often found as part of eucalypt communities.

== Ecology ==
The Kakadu plum provides food for important small mammals such as possums, rock rats, tree rats, and bandicoots. Since demand has increased for the fruit for human consumption, careful management is necessary to ensure its sustainability.

== Uses ==
=== Traditional uses ===
The fruit has been used as bush tucker or traditional medicine by Aboriginal Australian people over centuries.

The tree is particularly valued as a medicine by the Aboriginal peoples of the region, who use the inside of the bark for treating various skin ailments and infections.

=== Nutritional value ===
The Kakadu plum has a high concentration of vitamin C in its fruit: recorded concentrations of 2300–3150 mg/100 g wet weight and occasionally as high as 5300 mg/100 g, compared with 50 mg/100 g for oranges, making it among the highest known of any natural source. It also contains a high oxalic acid content that may have toxicity when consumed.

=== Taste and modern uses ===
Kakadu plums taste "somewhat bland, but with a definite sour and astringent finish", sometimes salty. Its taste makes it suitable for making into jam, sauces and relishes.

Based on studies done by University of Queensland Centre for Nutrition and Food Sciences researchers over a decade, the fruit has been used as a preservative to maintain the freshness of prawns and frozen foods.

Because of its potential for varied uses as a food, cosmetic ingredient or preservative, there has been a need to manage its growth in the wild, and in addition, efforts have been made to involve Indigenous groups in the growing industry. The Northern Territory Government has created a five-year (2019–2023) management plan "to ensure wild populations of this native plant and its habitat are adequately maintained across the Northern Territory well into the future".

As of 2021, 50 kg (110 lb) powder, created by a processing plant in Queensland, sells for A$500 per kilogram wholesale, and 10 kg of fruit is needed to create a single kilogram of the powder.

== In Aboriginal languages ==
=== Northern Territory ===
In Kundjeyhmi, the language of Kakadu National Park where the English name "kakadu plum" originates, the fruit and tree are called anmarlak. In the closely related Kunwinjku language of West Arnhem Land, the word is manmorlak, or mandjiribidj in the Kuninjku dialect. In Yolŋu it is called ŋäṉ'ka-bakarra. The name murunga comes from an eastern Arnhem language.

=== Western Australia ===
In the languages of the Kimberley, Western Australia, the tree is known as gubinge (from the Bardi language) mardorr, yuminyarri and jambalbeng.
